

Early 17th century (1601–1650)
 1601 
Capture of Portobello (1601) 17 January – English expedition assaulted and took Portobello from the Spanish, acquired some booty and then sacked the place.
 Battle of Wenden (1601) 7 January – The battle is significant as the first encounter between Swedish reiters and Polish hussars.
 Battle of Kokenhausen 23 June – Was the battle opening the Polish–Swedish War (1600–1611)
 Siege of Rheinberg 12 June – 2 August – Was the siege of the towns of Rheinberg and Meurs, Rheinberg eventually capitulated on 28 July after a Spanish relief force failed to relieve the city. The town of Meurs surrendered 2 August
 Siege of Ostend 5 July – 20 September 1604 was a three-year siege of the city of Ostend during the Eighty Years' War and the Anglo–Spanish War.
 Battle of Guruslău 3 August – Between the Wallachia, Habsburg Monarchy, & Cossacks against Principality of Transylvania & Moldavia. Wallachian-Austrian victory, Transylvania is taken out from the Ottoman suzerainty
 Siege of Nagykanizsa Ottoman Turks 9 September – 18 November – of Nagykanizsa (Kanije) fort defeat an invading army of Habsburg monarchy. 
 Battle of Carinish – Scottish clan battle between Clan MacLeod of Dunvegan and the Clan MacDonald of Sleat, that ended with a MacDonald victory.
 Battle at Etzanoa – Near modern Arkansas City, Kansas between Escanxaque and New Spain
 Battle of Coire Na Creiche Scottish clan battle Between Clan MacLeod of Dunvegan and the Clan MacDonald of Sleat, that ended with a MacDonald victory. It was the last clan battle in Skye.
 Siege of Donegal – Between Ireland & Gaelic Allies and Tyrone's rebels. Having suffered several repulses rebels abandoned the siege and moved his army southwards to Munster to take part in the Battle of Kinsale.
 Siege of Wolmar 18 October – 18 December – The Swedish artillery managed to hold back the Poles, but on 8 December Polish siege cannons arrived and an intense bombardment of Wolmar continued for ten days when Swedes asked for conditions of surrender.
 Siege of 's-Hertogenbosch 1–27 November – Unsuccessful Dutch attempt to capture the city of 's-Hertogenbosch, North Brabant, Spanish Netherlands
 Naval Battle of Castlehaven 6 December – Between a Spanish naval convoy of six ships and an English fleet consisting of four warships. Five out of six Spanish ships were either sunk, captured, or run aground in the battle, while the English fleet lost no ships.
 Naval Battle of Bantam 27 December – In Bantam Bay, Indonesia. Between a fleet of 5 Dutch ships and a Portuguese fleet of 8 galleons and several fustas. The Portuguese were forced to retreat.
 Siege of Kinsale 2 October 1601 – 3 January 1602 – Ultimate battle in England's conquest of Gaelic Ireland.
 1602
Battle of Morar – Scottish clan battle between the Clan MacDonell of Glengarry against the Clan Mackenzie who were supported by the Clan Ross. Near Loch Morar, in the Scottish Highlands.
 Battle of Kinsale 3 January – At the climax of the Nine Years' War a campaign by Hugh O'Neill, Hugh Roe O'Donnell and other Irish lords against English rule.
 Siege of Fellin 25 March – 17 May – Polish and Lithuanian forces led by Grand Crown Hetman Jan Zamoyski besieged the Swedish-held town of Fellin (present-day Viljandi in Estonia).
 Siege of Weissenstein 31 May – 30 September – Polish-Lithuanian army of 2,000 troops besiege Weissenstein (now known as Paide in Estonia). The Swedes capitulated on 30 September.
 Burning of Dungannon June – Marked the beginning of the final stage of Tyrone's Rebellion
 Naval Battle of Sesimbra Bay 3 June – Between an English naval expeditionary force of 5 Galleons and a Spanish fleet of 11 galleys a large Carrack and help from a fort and shore batteries.
 Battle of Reval 30 June – The Polish forces had been sent against Swedish forces gathering outside Tallinn. The Swedish lines broke as a result.
 Siege of Dunboy 5–18 June – Dunboy was a stronghold of Donal Cam O'Sullivan Beare, After the loss at Kinsale. O'Sullivan resolved to continue the fight and rallied his forces at Dunboy. The English crown sent an army of between 4000 and 5000
 Siege of Grave 18 July – 20 September - The Netherlands and England capture Grave from Spain.
 Naval Battle of the Narrow Seas 3–4 October – An English and Dutch fleet of 9 Galleons, Carracks & Galiots intercepted and attacked 6 Spanish galleys in the Dover Straits and was fought off the coast of England and finally off the Spanish Netherlands.
 L'Escalade 11–12 December – Notable and failed attempt by Catholic Savoy to conquer Protestant Geneva. After the defeat the Duke of Savoy accepted a lasting peace, sealed by the Treaty of St. Julien of 12 July 1603
 1603 
 Battle of Glen Fruin 7 February – Scottish clan battle between the Clan Gregor and its allies on one side, and the Clan Colquhoun and its allies on the other. 
 Naval Battle of Puerto Caballos 17 February – Military campaign to capture the Spanish town and port of Puerto Caballos (present day Puerto Cortés) by an English fleet that were able to achieve victory.
 Battle of Rakvere 5 March – The siege of Dorpat commenced. On 5 March 1603 at Rakvere with 1,000 men Jan Chodkiewicz defeated the Swedish relief force of 2,000
 Raid on Santiago de Cuba 12 May – Minor military campaign that took place towards the end of the Anglo–Spanish War in May 1603. Santiago de Cuba was attacked and sacked by English privateers led by Christopher Cleeve
 Naval Battle of Sluis 26 May – Spanish fleet of 8 Galleys defeated by the Dutch fleet of 3 men of war, 2 galleys and several smaller vessels. The Spanish commander Federico Spinola died.
 Battle of Brașov 17 July – Fought between the troops of Wallachia led by Radu Șerban and the Habsburg Empire on one side and the Transylvanian troops led by Mózes Székely on the other side
 Capture of Tabriz 1–21 October – The capture of Tabriz from the Ottoman Turks by the Safavid army of Shah Abbas I. After twenty days fighting during the Ottoman–Safavid War (1603–1618)
 Battle of Rakvere - battle during Polish–Swedish War (1600–1611)
 1604 
Battle of Urmia – Between the Safavid and Ottoman empires and resulted in a decisive Safavid victory.
 Battle of Lješkopolje – Ali-beg Mimibegović led an army from Podgorica and clashed with 400 Montenegrins in Lješanska nahija. The battle lasted through the night, at dawn Montenegrins launched a sudden charge surprising the enemy. Ali-beg was wounded and retreated
 Siege of Sluis 19 May – 19 August – A States and English army crossed the Scheldt estuary and advanced on land taking Cadzand, Aardenburg and IJzendijke in the Spanish Netherlands. This led to the siege of the Spanish held inland port of Sluis.
 Naval Battle of the Gulf of Cadiz 7 August – The battle took place when a flotilla of two galleons engaged two English privateers who were plundering shipping lanes and villages around the Gulf of Cádiz.
 Battle of Weissenstein 25 September – Between Sweden and the Polish–Lithuanian Commonwealth. The battle ended with the total defeat of the Swedish army.
 Battle of Novhorod-Siverskyi 31 December – First major battle of False Dmitry I against Boris Godunov.
 1605 
 Battle of Dobrynichi 21 January – Pretender to the Russian throne defeated, but escapes.
 Siege of Kromy February - May - Last major clash between Boris Godunov's troops and False Dmitry I's.
 Battle of Kircholm 27 September – Polish hussars cavalry defeated numerically superior Swedes.
 Battle of Mülheim 9 October - Spain defeats The Netherlands.
 Siege of Wachtendonk 8 - 28 October - Spain captures Wachtendonk from The Netherlands.
 1606 
 Battle of Udycz 28 – January between the Polish-Lithuanian Commonwealth forces and the horde of Crimean Tatars. Polish forces defeated Crimean Tatars, near Udych River.
 Siege of Kandahar November 1605 - January 1606 – When Emperor Akbar died on 27 October 1605, the Safavid governor of Herat, moved to recapture Kandahar on behalf of the Safavids while the Mughals were distracted.
 Battle of Gol 10 March – Susenyos defeats the combined armies of Yaqob and Abuna Petros II, making him Emperor of Ethiopia.
 Naval Battle of Cape Rachado 16 - 18 August – Dutch East India Company and Portuguese fleets. Portuguese victory.
 Siege of Groenlo 3 August - 9 November – Forces led by Ambrosio Spinola take the city, which remained in Spanish hands until 1627.
 Siege of Rheinberg 22 August - 1 October – Spain captures Rheinberg from The Netherlands.
 Siege of Malacca – Portuguese garrison managed to hold out and stop any Dutch direct attacks on the city until additional reinforcements could arrive, which made the Dutch retreat from the siege.
 1607 
 Battle of Gibraltar 25 April – Dutch fleet destroys anchored Spanish fleet.
 Battle of Guzów 6 July – Between the forces of the Zebrzydowski Rebellion against the Polish Royalists supporting King Sigismund III Vasa under the command of Polish Grand Crown Hetman
 Battle of Kozelsk 8 October – The first victory of False Dmitry II against the government of Tsar Vasili IV Shiusk
 Raid on Bone Raid by the Tuscan Order of St. Stephen against the Ottoman town of Bone (Annaba, Algeria)
 1608 
 Battle of Ebenat 17 January – Emperor Susenyos surprises an Oromo army, killing 12,000 Oromo at a cost of 400 soldiers.
 Battle of Bolkhov 10–11 May – Between troops of False Dmitry II and the army of Tsar Vasily Shuisky.
 Battle of Kilmacrennan 5 July – Skirmish fought near Kilmacrennan, County Donegal during O'Doherty's Rebellion
 Siege of Troitsky monastery 23 September – 12 January 1610 – An attempt of the Polish–Lithuanian irregular army that acted in support of False Dmitry II to capture the Trinity Monastery (the modern Trinity Lavra of St. Sergius) north of Moscow. The siege lasted for 16 months
 Capture of Daugavgrīva - Swedish priority during Polish–Swedish War (1600–1611).
 Battle of Zaraysk - Lisowczyks defeat troops loyal to Vasili IV of Russia.
 Battle of Medvezhiy Brod - False Dmitry II's troops defeat Lisowczyks.
 1609
Siege of Pärnu 28 February – 2 March – The Polish–Lithuanian miners blew up three of the main gates of the city and Lithuanian troops fought their way to the city's center and captures the city
 Battle of Kamenka 15 May
 Battle of Torzhok 17 June
 Battle of Tver 13 July
 Battle of Tver 15 July
 Iroquois War (1609) 30 July – Two Frenchmen and 60 natives Huron's encountered a group of 200 Iroquois. Near Ticonderoga and Crown Point, New York. The Hurons and the French routed the enemy, killing fifty and taking twelve prisoners, whom they tortured until death
 Battle of Kaljazin 18 August
 Battle of Daugavgrīva (1609) 6 October – Swedes managed to avoid battle for four days, finally Lithuanian's abandoned camp, leaving a small force and hid in the nearby woods. Swedes couldn't resist and attacked the weakly defended Lithuanian camp and were surprised by Lithuanian counterattack from the woods.
 Battle of Troitsko 28 October
 Battle of Tashiskari - Kartlian rebels led by Giorgi Saakadze win against Ottoman forces.
 Battle of Salis - Polish ambush on Swedes heading towards Riga.
 Siege of Smolensk - Polish victory capturing Smolensk.
 1610 
Battle of Rzjov April
 Battle of Sorel 19 June – Between the Kingdom of France and its allies, the Wyandot people, Algonquin people and Innu people that fought against the Mohawk people in New France at present-day Sorel-Tracy, Quebec.
 Battle of Klusina 24 June
 Siege of Troitse-Sergiyeva Lavra 23 September 1608 – 12 January – Sixteen-month siege of Trinity Monastery fails.
 Battle of Kluszyn 4 July – During Time of Troubles in Russia. Polish army defeated Russians and Swedes.
 Siege of Tsaryovo-Zaymishche 16 June - 26 July - Polish captured the fort from the Russians.
 Siege of Jülich 28 July - 2 September - The Netherlands and France capture Jülich from Spain and Austria.
 1611 
 Siege of Kalmar 3 May – 3 August – Occurred during the Kalmar War and constituted the major part of an intensive conflict between Denmark-Norway and Sweden.
 Storming of Kristianopel 26 June – The Swedes managed to siege the fortified city and went in by bombing the fortress port, which was badly defended.
 Siege of Smolensk – Ended in June, Poland captures city after two-year siege.
 Conquest of Novgorod 15 July
 1612
Battle of Vittsjö 11 February
Battle of Kringen 26 August – Norwegian peasant militia ambush Scottish mercenary soldiers on their way to enlist in the Swedish army.
Battle of Moscow (1612) 1 & 3 September – A series of two battles, which took place in Moscow, during the Polish–Muscovite War (1605–18). The battles ended in tactical Russian victory.
 Naval Battle at Surat 29 August – Portuguese fleet was defeated by the English, off the coast of Surat, India.
 Naval Battle of Swally 9–10 December – Took place off the coast of Suvali a village near the Surat city (now in Gujarat, India) and was a victory for four English East India Company galleons over four Portuguese galleons and 26 barks
 Battle of Cornul lui Sas - Moldavian victory
 1613 
Battle of Port Royal October – Captain Samuel Argall leads a force from Virginia to attack Acadia destroying Port Royal and other French outposts in eastern Canada.
 Siege of Tikhvin 4 June – 25 September – Local Streltsy and noblemen rose up against the Swedish garrison and destroyed it. The Swedes undertook a punitive expedition to Tikhvin and burned the town, but could not take the Assumption Monastery.
 Siege of Smolensk (1613–1617) – Russian troops led a protracted and unsuccessful siege of the city. During the siege, no attempt was made to assault. In the beginning of 1617 the siege was lifted.
 Naval Battle of Cape Corvo August – A naval engagement of the Ottoman–Habsburg wars. fought as part of the struggle for the control of the Mediterranean, near the island of Samos. Spanish squadron from Sicily, engaged an Ottoman fleet.
 1614 
Raid on Żejtun 6–12 July – The last major attack made by the Ottoman Empire against the island of Malta, which was then ruled by the Order of St. John.
 Battle of Bronnitsy 14 July
 Siege of Aachen Late August 1614 – Spanish Army of Flanders, marched from Maastricht to Germany to support Wolfgang Wilhelm, Count Palatine of Neuburg, during the War of the Jülich Succession.
 Battle of Imafuku November – Tokugawa Ieyasu attacks and captures the village of Imafuku by defeating Toyotomi clan forces.
 Siege of Osaka 8 November – 22 January 1615 – A series of battles undertaken by the Tokugawa shogunate against the Toyotomi clan, and ending in that clan's destruction.
 Battle of Imafuku Late November – The village of Imafuku stood on the northeast approach to Osaka, and so Tokugawa Ieyasu sent 1500 men to secure the site for a fort. They faced 600 men loyal to the Toyotomi "Western Army," 
 Battle of Shigino 26 November – Five thousand Tokugawa troops, led by Uesugi Kagekatsu, engaged 2000 troops loyal to the Toyotomi at a place called Shigino, across the Yamato River (now called the Neyagawa) from the site of the Battle of Imafuku
 1615
 Siege of Braunschweig, 1615 – Duke Friedrich Ulrich of Braunschweig-Wolfenbüttel laid siege to the city of Braunschweig (the second siege after 1605–1606). Hanseatic & Dutch relief forces broke the siege.
 Cossack raid on Istanbul (1615) – A campaign of the Zaporozhian Cossacks, The attack successfully penetrated the capital of the Ottoman Empire, entered its harbor, and burned ships before returning to their base.
 Battle of Kashii 26 May – Tokugawa forces defeat Toyotomi forces during the conflict over Osaka.
 Battle of Yao 2 June – The battle occurred in 1615 during the Siege of Osaka, in which Tokugawa Ieyasu planned to destroy the Toyotomi clan. It was fought between the Tōdō clan and the Chōsokabe clan. Tõdõ clan won the battle
 Battle of Dōmyōji 2 June – The Eastern Army of Tokugawa Ieyasu and the Osaka Army of Toyotomi Hideyori clashed in battle at Dōmyōji. This battle was one of Japan's major historical battles between samurai forces.
 Battle of Tennōji 3 June – Final defeat of Toyotomi Hideyori, son of Hideyoshi
 Naval Battle of Zaule – Venetians With a galley and several smaller ships occupied the Zaule salt pan and began to destroy it.
 Siege of Pskov (1615) 9 August – 27 October – Approaching Pskov, the Swedes tried to take it immediately, but were repelled by the Pskov garrison with heavy losses. After two and a half months, the Swedes withdrew from Pskov to Narva
 Battle of Oneida 16 October – Champlain Battle where Samuel Dechamplain aided by 10 Frenchmen and 300 Hurons attacked the stockaded Oneida Indian village.
 Naval Action off La Goulette December – A victory for a Spanish privateer squadron under Francisco de Ribera over a Tunisian fleet.
 Battle of Tsitsamuri - Kingdom of Kakheti battles the Safavid domination.
 1616
 Naval Battle of Cape Celidonia 14 July – A small Spanish fleet of 5 Galleons and a patache, cruising off Cyprus was attacked by an Ottoman fleet of 55 Galleys. The Spanish ships, managed to repel the Ottomans, inflicting heavy losses.
 Battle of Toppur – One of the largest battles in the history of South Asia. It causes complete destruction of already declining Vijaya Nagara Empire.
 Siege of Vercelli – Spanish forces capture the Savoyard fortress
 1617 
 Sacking of Saint Thomas of Guyana – Walter Raleigh's second El Dorado expeditions sacked the second settlement of Saint Thomas of Guyana in 1617
 Second Battle of Playa Honda – Spanish victory in the Philippines during Eighty Years' War
 The Spanish-Dutch Naval Battle of 1617 Outside Manila Bay – Naval battle which decided the future of the Philippines for centuries to come was fought outside Manila Bay
 1618 
 Siege of Pilsen 19 September – 21 November – The first major battle of the Thirty Years' War. The Protestant victory under Ernst von Mansfeld and their subsequent capture of the city enlarged the Bohemian Revolt.
 Battle of Orynin 28 September – Polish forces faced Crimean Tatars from Budjak, The battle took place near Orynin in Podolia.
 Siege of Moscow (1618) 2–11 October – The last major military action of Wladyslaw IV's campaign of 1617–1618 and the entire Polish-Muscovite War (1605–1618). An assault was unsuccessful. The Polish-Lithuanian government went to the conclusion of the Truce of Deulino.
 Battle of Lomnice 9 November – The Protestant army of the Bohemian Estates under Heinrich Matthias von Thurn defeats the Roman Catholic army of the Habsburg monarchy under Charles Bonaventure de Longueval, Count of Bucquoy.
 Battle of Mozhaysk - precursor to aforementioned Battle of Moscow.
 1619 
 Battle of Sablat 10 June – The Habsburg army under Bucquoy defeats the Protestant Bohemian army under Mansfeld, thereby lifting the siege of České Budějovice.
 Battle of Sarhū 14–18 April – The Manchus defeat the Ming.
 Battle of Wisternitz 5 August – Bohemia defeats a Habsburg army.
 Siege of Batavia castle in 1619 30 May – JP Coen decided that Jakatra (later Batavia) would be a better base for the VOC on Java than Bantam and set out to capture the city. The sultan or Mataram, under whose influence Jakatra fell, was opposed to this and resisted strongly. 
 Battle of Humenné - Only battle of Thirty Years' War that Poland participated in, defeating a Transylvanian army that supported the Bohemian revolt
 1620 
Cossack raid on Istanbul (1620) – A campaign of the Zaporozhian Cossacks, to the capital Ottoman Empire.
 Battle of Cecora (1620) 17 September – 7 October – (Tutora) Ottoman Turks defeat Polish–Lithuanian Commonwealth army
 Battle of White Mountain 8 November – The Catholic League and the Habsburg Imperial army defeat a Bohemian-Palatinate force, deciding the fate of Prague and ending the rule of "Winter King" Frederick in Bohemia
 1621 
 Blockade of La Rochelle 1621–1622 – The repression of the Huguenot rebellion by the French king Louis XIII.
 Siege of Saint-Jean-d'Angély (1621) 30 May – 24 June – Siege accomplished by French king Louis XIII, against the Protestant stronghold of Saint-Jean-d'Angély.
 Siege of Clairac 23 July – 4 August – During the Huguenot uprisings, after taking the city of Saint-Jean-d'Angély, Louis XIII made the decision to go south to subdue Guyenne, and to besiege Clairac which was a bastion of Protestantism.
 Battle of Gibraltar (1621) 10 August – During the Eighty Years' War. A Dutch VOC fleet, escorted by Haultain's squadron was intercepted and defeated by nine ships of Spain's Atlantic fleet Armada del Mar Océano, while crossing the Strait of Gibraltar.
 Battle of Khotyn 2 September – 9 October – Polish–Lithuanian Commonwealth army stops great Turkish invasion.
 Siege of Jülich (1621–22) 5 September 1621 – 3 February 1622 – After five months of siege, the Spanish army took the Dutch-occupied fortress of Jülich, compelling its garrison to surrender.
 Siege of Montauban August – November – A siege accomplished by the young French king Louis XIII, against the Protestant stronghold of Montauban. Despite a strength of about 25,000 men, Louis XIII was unable to capture the city of Montauban
 1622 
Indian massacre of 1622 1 April – Powhatan braves came unarmed into our houses with deer, turkeys, fish, fruits, and other provisions to sell and the warriors grabbed any tools or weapons they saw and killed all the English settlers they found.
 Battle of Wiesloch 25 April – The Protestant army of the Electoral Palatinate under Count Mansfield defeat the Catholic League army under Johann Tserclaes, Count of Tilly in Thirty Years' War.
 Siege of Royan May – Siege accomplished by the French king Louis XIII against the Protestant stronghold of Royan
 Battle of Wimpfen 6 May – Forces of the Catholic League under Count Tilly and of Spain under Gonzalo Córdoba defeat Protestant forces of Baden and the Palatinate under George Frederick, Margrave of Baden-Durlach 
 Siege of Nègrepelisse 10–11 June – Siege accomplished by the French king Louis XIII against the Protestant stronghold of Nègrepelisse in France
 Battle of Höchst 20 June – The joint Spanish-League army under Cordoba and Tilly attempted to stop the junction of Christian of Brunswick and Mansfeld. They were able to intercept Christian before he could cross the River Main at Höchst.
 Battle of Macau 22–24 June – A conflict of the Dutch–Portuguese War fought in the Portuguese settlement of Macau, in southeastern China.
 Siege of Bergen-op-Zoom (1622) 18 July – 2 October – The Spanish laid siege to the Dutch city of Bergen op Zoom. The population was divided between Protestants, who favored resistance and Catholics, who favored a Spanish conquest. The Spanish had to lift the siege on their failed blockade of a Protestant relief force in the Battle of Fleurus. 
 Siege of Heidelberg (1622) 23 July – 19 September – Between the Imperial-Spanish army against the Anglo-Protestant forces during the Palatinate campaign.
 Siege of Montpellier August – October – A siege of the Huguenot city of Montpellier by the Catholic forces of Louis XIII of France, It was part of the Huguenot rebellions.
 Battle of Fleurus 29 August – Spanish tactical victory against the Protestant army of Mansfeld and Christian of Brunswick but the breakthrough of their opponents towards Bergen-op-Zoom forces Spain to lift the siege of the Dutch city.
 Naval battle of Saint-Martin-de-Ré 27 October – Between the Huguenot fleet of La Rochelle under Jean Guiton, and a Royal fleet under Charles de Guise.
 Battle of Mbumbi 18 December – A military engagement between forces of Portuguese Angola and the Kingdom of Kongo.
 Capture of Hurmuz – Persian capture Hurmuz with the aid of the English East Indian Company's ships
 1623 
Battle of Mbanda Kasi January
Battle of Stadtlohn 6 August – The Count of Tilly leads Catholic forces to victory over the Protestants.
Battle of Anjar 1 November
Capture of Bahia 22 December – Dutch victory in the Dutch–Portuguese War
 1624
 Capture of Baghdad 14 January – Persians attack and capture Baghdad
 Capture of Salvador 8 May - The Netherlands capture Salvador, Bahia from Portugal.
 Battle of Martynów 20 June – Between the Polish-Lithuanian Commonwealth forces and the horde of Crimean Tatars.
 Battle of Penghu August - China captures Fengguiwei Fort from the Netherlands and liberates Penghu.
 Cossack raids on Istanbul (1624) 9 July – 20 August – Campaigns of Zaporozhian Cossacks to the capital of the Ottoman Empire.
 Siege of Breda 28 August – 5 June 1625 – Dutch fortress falls into Spanish hands in 1625.
 Action of 3 October 1624 - Spanish-Tuscan-Papal victory over Algerian pirates
 Third Battle of Playa Honda – The Netherlands defeats Spain
 1625 
 Recapture of Bahia – Decisive Spanish–Portuguese victory
 Battle of Blavet 17 January – Between the Huguenot forces and a French fleet in Blavet harbour (Port de Blavet, modern Port-Louis), Brittany, triggering the Second Huguenot rebellion against the Crown of France.
 Action of 1 February 1625 Part of the Dutch–Portuguese War
 Battle of Marabda 1 July – A battle between troops of Iran and the kingdoms of Kartli and Kakheti (Eastern Georgia) near the village of Marabda (lower Kartli, 20 km from Tbilisi).
 Battle of Elmina (1625) 25 October – Failed Dutch attempt to take a Portuguese fortress
 Battle of San Juan (1625) 24 September – 2 November – A Dutch expedition attacked the island of Puerto Rico, but despite besieging San Juan for two months, was unable to capture it from Spain.
 Recovery of Ré island 12–15 September – Accomplished by the army of Louis XIII, against the troops of the Protestant admiral Soubise and the Huguenot forces of La Rochelle, who had been occupying the Island of Ré since February 1625 as part of the Huguenot rebellions.
 Naval Cádiz expedition (1625) 1–7 November – Naval expedition against Spain by English and Dutch forces.
 Battle of Martqopi - Kartlian forces battle against the Safavid armies.
 1626 
 Battle of Wallhof 7 January – Gustavus Adolphus of Sweden defeats a Polish force during the Polish–Swedish War (1626–29).
 Battle of Bauska
 Battle of Ningyuan 2–10 February – A battle between the Ming dynasty and the Jurchen Later Jin (later known as the Qing dynasty)
 Battle of Dessau Bridge 25 April – Catholic forces of the Holy Roman Empire under Wallenstein defeat Protestant Danish-German troops under Mansfeld on the Elbe River outside Dessau, Germany
 Battle at Lenz (1626) 5 July – Rebel Austrian Boers defeated
 Siege of Steenwijk(1626)
 Siege of Oldenzaal (1626) 23 July – 1 August – Took place in the Spanish held town of Oldenzaal in the Twente region. After an eight-day siege the city surrendered to Dutch-English forces. 
 Battle of Mitau (1626)
 Battle of Gniew 22 September – 1 October – Between Sweden and the Polish–Lithuanian Commonwealth. The battle ended with a victory for Sweden.
 Battle of Selburg 30 September – Between Sweden and the Polish–Lithuanian Commonwealth. The Polish forces managed to recapture Selburg from the Swedes earlier in 1626 in response the Swedish capture the town.
 Battle of Lutter am Berenberge – The Danish army under King Christian IV is defeated by the German Catholic League under Tilly
 Battle of Wenden (1626) 3 December – A battle fought during the Polish–Swedish War (1626–1629), between Sweden and the Polish-Lithuanian Commonwealth on 3 December 1626 at Wenden (Cēsis, Kiesia) in present-day Latvia.
 Battle of Bazaleti - Combat between two rival Kakhetian factions; Teimuraz I of Kakheti and Giorgi Saakadze.
 1627 
 Battle of Czarne 12–17 April – The battle ended with a Swedish surrender mainly due to low morale of the German mercenaries in Swedish service.
 Siege of Saint-Martin-de-Ré 12 July – 27 October – Was an attempt by English forces to capture the French fortress-city of Saint-Martin-de-Ré, on the isle of Ré (near La Rochelle)
 Battle of Dirschau 7–8 August – Indecisive battle during the Polish–Swedish War (1626–29)
 Siege of Groenlo – A Dutch army led by Frederick Henry, Prince of Orange liberates the city from Spanish rule.
 Battle of Oliwa 28 November – Battle in the Polish–Swedish War (1626–29). It was the biggest and the last naval battle of the Polish royal navy.
 Siege of La Rochelle September 1627 – October 1628 – Between the French royal forces and the Huguenots of La Rochelle. The siege marked the apex of the tensions between the Catholics and the Protestants in France, and ended with a complete 'victory' for King Louis XIII and the Catholics.
 1628 
Tartar raid into Ukraine – A tartar raid into Ukraine as far as Belaya Terkov provoked Cossack reprisals
 Battle of Treiden (1628) 1 February – During the Polish–Swedish War between Polish–Lithuanian Commonwealth and the Swedish Empire. Polish-Lithuanian Commonwealth forces defeated the Swedish forces 
 Siege of Stralsund (1628) May – 4 August – A siege laid on Stralsund by the Imperial Army during the Thirty Years' War, Stralsund was aided by Denmark and Sweden, with considerable Scottish participation. The battle marked the de facto entrance of Sweden into the war.
 Battle of Danzig 16 June
 Weichselmünde 1628 6 July – Finnish troops in king Gustavus's field army in Prussia launched a special operation attack on the Polish and Danzig fleets that had been hiding from the blockaging Swedish navy in the Weichselmünde harbour.
 Action of 17 July 1628 17 July – The largest incident of the North American phase of the Beaver Wars. The English force succeeded in capturing a supply convoy bound for New France, severely impairing that colony's ability to resist attack.
 Siege of Batavia 22 August – 3 December – First siege of Batavia. A military campaign led by Sultan Agung of Mataram to capture the Dutch port-settlement of Batavia in Java.
 Battle of Wolgast 2 September – Danish forces had made landfall on Usedom, and expelled the imperial occupation forces. An Imperial army left the besieged Stralsund to confront the Danes. Ultimately, the Danish forces were defeated.
 Battle of Osterode 14 October 
 Battle in the Bay of Matanzas – Dutch fleet led by Admiral Piet Hein was able to defeat and capture the Spanish treasure fleet.
 1629 
 Battle of Treiden (1628) 1 February – Between Polish–Lithuanian Commonwealth and the Swedish Empire Polish-Lithuanian Commonwealth forces defeated the Swedish forces.
 Naval Battle of Duyon River – Naval engagement between the Portuguese forces commanded by the last great commander of Portuguese India, and the forces of the Sultanate of Aceh.
 Battle of Górzno 12 February – Swedish victory during the Polish–Swedish War (1626–29)
 Siege of Privas 14–28 May – Was undertaken by Louis XIII of France the city of Privas was captured on 28 May 1629. It was one of the last events of the Huguenot rebellions 
 Siege of Batavia May–September – Second Siege of Batavia, A military campaign led by Sultan Agung of Mataram to capture the Dutch port-settlement of Batavia in Java; both were unsuccessful
 Battle of Trzciana 25 June – Polish victory during the Polish–Swedish War (1626–29)
 Battle of St. Kitts (1629) 17 June – 7 September – Successful Spanish expedition that seized the islands of Saint Kitts and Nevis from the English and French during the Anglo-Spanish War (1625–30).
 Siege of Alès ? – 17 June – Undertaken by Louis XIII of France, and the city captured on 17 June 1629.
 Siege of 's-Hertogenbosch – Dutch army takes a city loyal to the Spanish king.
 1630 
 Battle of Veillane 10 July – Between a French army and a Spanish army. The result was a French victory.
 Battle of Randeniwela 25 August – Battle fought in the Sinhalese–Portuguese War. Between Senarat against the Portuguese
 Siege of Recife (1630) – The Dutch captured Recife, in Portuguese Brazil. This began a war over Brazil, which would see the Dutch establish a colony called New Holland.
 1631 
 Battle of Frankfurt an der Oder 13 April – Between the Swedish Empire and the Holy Roman Empire for the strategically important, fortified Oder crossing Frankfurt an der Oder, Brandenburg, Germany
 Sack of Baltimore 20 June – The only recorded instance of a slaving raid by corsairs in Ireland 
 Battle of Magdeburg (ended 20 May) – The Imperial-League army under Tilly capture and pillage the town.
 Battle of Werben 1 August – Between the Swedish Empire and the Holy Roman Empire. The Swedes forced them to retreat.
 Battle of Albrolhos 10 August – Spanish Admiral Oquendo defeated the Dutch after a six-hour naval battle.
 Battle of the Slaak 12–13 September – Crushing Dutch victory over the Spanish fleet
 Battle of Breitenfeld 17 September – Saxons and Swedes defeat the Imperial-League army under Tilly.
 1632 
Battle of Rain 5 April – Count of Tilly killed in battle with the Swedes.
Capture of Maastricht 9 June – 22 August – Frederick Henry, Prince of Orange eventually captured the city from Spanish forces.
 Siege of Nuremberg – Battle campaign that took place in 1632 about the Imperial City of Nuremberg during the Thirty Years' War.
Battle of Wiesloch (1632) 16 August – During the Thirty Years' War near the German city of Wiesloch, south of Heidelberg. A Swedish army fought an army of the Holy Roman Empire. The battle resulted in a Swedish victory.
 Battle of the Alte Veste 3–4 September – During the Siege of Nuremberg, Sweden is defeated by the Holy Roman Empire under Wallenstein, leading to the Imperial advance into Saxony.
Battle of Castelnaudary 1 September – Between the rebel forces of Henri II de Montmorency (loyal to Gaston, Duke of Orléans) and the royalist forces of Marshal Henri de Schomberg (loyal to King Louis XIII).
Siege of Smolensk (1632–33) 28 October 1632 – 4 October 1633 – The Muscovite army besieged the Polish–Lithuanian city of Smolensk during the Smolensk War
Battle of Lützen 16 November – Protestant Swedish forces defeat the Imperial army under Wallenstein in Saxony but King Gustavus Adolphus is killed.
1633 
 Siege of Rheinberg 11 June – 2 July - The Netherlands capture Rheinberg from Spain. 
 Battle of Liaoluo Bay 7 July – 22 October – The Dutch East India Company were decisively defeated by the Ming China.
 Battle of Oldendorf 8 July – The Swedish Empire and Hesse-Kassel defeat the Holy Roman Empire near Hessisch Oldendorf. 
1634
Battle of Amritsar 5 June – Between Guru Hargobind Ji and the forces of the Mughal army. Shah Jahan worried over the growing influence of the Sikhs and angered by the loss of a valued hawk seeks to teach a lesson to Guru Hargobind
 Battle of Nördlingen 6–7 September – The Imperial armies number 33,000 troops, the Protestant forces with 25,000. At the end of the day, 12,000 Protestants are dead, another 4,000 captured, including Swedish army leader Gustaf Horn.
 Siege of Maastricht 30 June – 8 September - Spain fails to capture Maastricht from the Netherlands.
Battle of Strasbourg Bridge 28 September - Forces of the Holy Roman Empire under Charles of Lorraine and Johann von Werth defeat Sweden.
 1635
Battle of Kartarpur 25 April - Sikhs defeat the Mughal Empire.
Battle of Les Avins 20 May - France defeats Spain.
Siege of Leuven 24 June – 4 July - France and the Netherlands fail to capture Leuven from Spain.
Battle of Madou 23 November - The Netherlands defeats the Madou tribe of the Siraya people.
Battle on Christmas Day 26 December - The Netherlands defeats the Makatao people.
1636 
Siege of Schenkenschans 30 July 1635 – 30 April 1636 - The Netherlands captures Schenkenschanz from Spain.
Battle of Tornavento 22 June - Stalemate between an army of France and Savoy and an army from Spain.
Battle of Wittstock 4 October – Sweden defeats an army of Saxony and the Holy Roman Empire
Siege of Namhan - Qing invasion of Joseon
 1637 
 Battle off Lizard Point 18 February – Spanish fleet defeats an Anglo-Dutch merchant convoy off Lizard Point, Cornwall, England
 Battle of Elmina (1637) 24–29 August – The Dutch captured Fort Elmina from the Portuguese
 Siege of Roermond 29 August - 3 September - Spain captures Roermond from the Netherlands.
 Battle of Mombaldone – Victor Amadeus I, Duke of Savoy defeats a Spanish army
 Siege of Breda 21 July - 11 October – Frederick Henry, Prince of Orange retook the city
 Battle of Kumeyki 16 December - battle during Pavlyuk uprising
 1638 
Battle of Gannoruwa 28 March - Sri Lanka defeats Portugal.
Siege of Salvador April - May - The Netherlands fails to capture Salvador from Portugal and Spain.
Battle of Zhovnyn 13 June – 7 August - Poland defeats rebel cossacks.
Battle of Kallo 20 June – William of Nassau-Siegen tried to surround the city of Antwerp.
Battle of Breisach 18 August – 17 December - France and the German Protestant army of Bernard of Saxe-Weimar capture Breisach from Habsburg Austria.
Battle of Vlotho 17 October - An Imperial army under Melchior von Hatzfeldt defeats the Electoral Palatinate, England and Sweden.
Battle of Goa - Portugal defeats a Dutch fleet.
 1639 
Action of 18 February 1639 - The Netherlands defeat Spain in a naval battle near Dunkirk.
 Battle of Chemnitz 14 April - Sweden under Johan Banér defeats the Holy Roman Empire and Saxony led by Rodolfo Marazzino
 Relief of Thionville 7 June - Imperial and Spanish forces under Ottavio Piccolomini defeat the French siege army of the Marquis de Feuquieres and lift the siege of Thionville 
Battle of the Brig of Dee 18–19 June - Covenanters defeat the Royalists in a civil war in Scotland, Great Britain.
Action of 30 September 1639 – Naval battle in the Dutch–Portuguese War. Dutch ships captured and destroyed 3 Portuguese galleons.
Battle of the Downs – 21 October – Spanish navy defeated by Dutch in the English Channel.
 1640
Action of 12-17 January 1640 - Inconclusive naval battle a Dutch and a combined Spanish-Portuguese fleet.
Siege of Galle - The Netherlands and the Kingdom of Kandy conquer Galle from Portugal.
Battle of Hulst 4 July - Spain defeats The Netherlands.
Battle of Cádiz – 21 July - France defeats a Spanish fleet.
Battle of Newburn – 28 August - Covenanters from Scotland defeat a royalist English army.
Battle of Cambrils – 13–16 December - Spain defeats rebels from Catalonia, followed by a massacre.
1641 
Battle of Malacca 2 August 1640 - 14 January 1641 – Dutch efforts effectively destroyed the last bastion of Portuguese power.
Capture of Luanda 25 August – The Dutch captured Luanda from the Portuguese
Battle of Cape St. Vincent 4 November- Spain defeats a Dutch fleet.
 1642 
Battle of Kilrush 15 April - The Royalists defeat Confederate Ireland.
Battle of Rocroi 19 May - France defeats Spain.
Battle of Honnecourt 26 May – Spanish victory against a French army.
Battle of San Salvador 19 - 26 August - The Netherlands capture Keelung, San Salvador from Spain.
Battle of Lostwithiel 21 August – 2 September - The Royalists defeat the Parliamentarians in the English civil war.
Battle of Liscarroll 3 September - England defeats Ireland.
Battle of Powick Bridge 21 September - Royalists defeat the Parliamentarians.
Battle of Kings Norton 17 October - Parliamentarians defeat the Royalists.
Battle of Edgehill 23 October – First battle of English Civil War, a draw.
Second Battle of Breitenfeld 23 October – Swedish victory over Holy Roman Empire.
Battle of Aylesbury 1 November - Parliamentarians defeat the Royalists.
Battle of Brentford 12 November – Royalist cavalry defeats Roundheads, but has to retreat later.
Battle of Turnham Green 13 November - Strategic victory of the Parliamentarians over the Royalists.
Battle of Tadcaster 7 December - Royalists defeat the Parliamentarians.
 1643 
Battle of Braddock Down 19 January - Royalists defeat the Parliamentarians.
Battle of Leeds 23 January - Parliamentarians defeat the Royalists.
First Battle of Middlewich 13 March - Parliamentarians defeat the Royalists.
Battle of Hopton Heath 19 March - Inconclusive battle between the Royalists and the Parliamentarians.
Battle of Seacroft Moor 30 March - Royalists defeat the Parliamentarians.
Battle of Camp Hill 3 April - Royalists defeat the Parliamentarians.
Battle of Ripple Field 13 April - Royalists defeat the Parliamentarians.
Battle of Sourton Down 25 April - Parliamentarians defeat the Royalists.
Battle of Rocroi 19 May – French under Duc d'Enghien destroy Spanish military supremacy in Europe.
Battle of Clones 13 June - Royalists defeat the Irish Confederation.
Battle of Chalgrove Field 18 June - Royalists defeat the Parliamentarians.
Battle of Adwalton Moor 30 June – Royalists beat Roundheads near York.
Battle of Burton Bridge 4 July – Royalists capture Burton from the Roundheads.
Battle of Lansdowne 5 July – Royalists and Roundheads tie near Bath.
Battle of Roundway Down 13 July – Royalists crush Roundheads in West Country.
Battle of Gainsborough 28 July - Parliamentarians defeat the Royalists.
Battle of Portlester 7 August - The Irish confederation defeat the Royalists.
Battle of Aldbourne Chase 18 September - Inconclusive battle between the Royalists and the Parliamentarians.
First Battle of Newbury 20 September – Saved London from Royalists.
Battle of Winceby 11 October - Parliamentarians defeat the Royalists.
Battle of Tuttlingen 24 November – A combined Imperial-Bavarian army under Franz von Mercy defeats the French army under Josias von Rantzau, shattering their force and compelling them to retreat over the Rhine
Battle of Alton 13 December - Parliamentarians defeat the Royalists.
 1644 
Battle of Kolding 9 January - Sweden defeats Denmark-Norway.
Battle of Nantwich 25 January - Parliamentarians defeat the Royalists.
Battle of Ochmatów 30 January – Polish–Lithuanian army defeat Crimean Tatars.
Battle of Boldon Hill 24 March - Indecisive battle between the Royalists and the Scottish Covenanters.
Battle of Cheriton 29 March - Parliamentarians defeat the Royalists.
Battle of Selby 11 April - Parliamentarians defeat the Royalists.
Battle of Tipton Green 12 June - Inconclusive battle between the Royalists and the Parliamentarians.
Battle of Oswestry 22–23 June - Parliamentarians defeat the Royalists.
Battle of Cropredy Bridge 29 June – Charles defeats Roundheads under William Waller.
Battle of Marston Moor 2 July – Oliver Cromwell Roundheads defeat King Charles I of England's Cavaliers securing the North for the Puritans.
Battle of Freiburg (August) – Indecisive battle between French forces and the Bavarian army.
Battle of Tippermuir 1 September – Montrose's Royalists defeat Elcho's Covenanters.
Battle of Lostwithiel 2 September – Royalists surround Roundheads west of Plymouth.
Battle of Aberdeen (1644) 13 September – Royalist victory during Scottish Civil War
Second Battle of Newbury 27 October – Blocks Charles' return to London
Battle of Jüterbog – Sweden under Lennart Torstensson defeats Holy Roman Empire.
Battle of Lagoscuro – Allied Castro, Republic of Venice, Modena, and Tuscany forces defeat the papal army.
Battle of Fehmarn - Swedish-Dutch victory
 1645 
 Battle of Inverlochy 2 February – Highlanders defeat Covenanters
 Battle of Jankau 23 February - Swedish victory under Torstensson over an Imperial-Bavarian army under Hatzfeldt
 Battle of Herbsthausen 5 May – Bavaria under Mercy defeats France under Turenne during Thirty Years' War
 Battle of Auldearn 9 May – Royalist victory during Scottish Civil War
 Battle of Naseby 14 June – Cromwell's Ironsides defeat Charles' Cavaliers.
 Battle of Alford 2 July – defeated by Royalists under Montrose.
 Second Battle of Nördlingen 3 August – French-Hessian victory under d'Enghien and Turenne over an Imperial-Bavarian army under Mercy
 Battle of Tabocas 3 August – aka Battle of Mount Tabocas, battle between the Dutch and the Portuguese army
 Battle of Kilsyth 15 August – James Graham, 1st Marquess of Montrose defeats Covenanters in decisive battle.
 Battle of Philiphaugh 13 September – Under General David Leslie surprise Montrose in camp, Montrose runs away.
 Siege of Hulst 7 October - 4 November – The heavily fortified town was conquered by Dutch troops commanded by Frederick Henry after only 28 days.
 1646  
Battle of Bovey Heath 9 January - Parliamentarians defeat the Royalists.
Battle of Torrington 16 February - Parliamentarians defeat the Royalists.
Battles of La Naval de Manila 15 – 4 March October – Two quickly fitted out Spanish-Filipino crewed Manila galleons repel a Dutch invasion fleet in 5 separate battles.
Battle of Stow-on-the-Wold 21 March - Parliamentarians defeat the Royalists.
Action of 26 May 1646 - Skirmish between Ottoman and Venetian troops
Battle of Benburb 5 June – Irish Ulster army under Owen Roe O'Neill defeat Scots.
 1647 
Battle of Rhunahaorine Moss 24 May - Covenanters defeat the Royalists.
Battle of Puerto de Cavite 10 June – Spanish defenders defeat Dutch invasion in the Philippines during Eighty Years' War.
Battle of Dungan's Hill August– Irish Leinster army destroyed by Parliamentarians.
Battle of Triebl 22 August – Imperial troops defeat Sweden.
 Battle of Kombi 29 October – Decisive Dutch victory over the Portuguese Empire.
Battle of Knocknanuss 13 November – Irish Munster army destroyed in Cork by Inchiquin.
 1648 
First Battle of Guararapes 18 April – Dutch and Portuguese forces in Pernambuco, in a dispute for the dominion of that part of Brazil
Battle of Zhovti Vody 29 April-16 May - first major battle in Khmelnytsky Uprising
Siege of Candia 1 May - 20+ year-long siege beginning the end of the Ottoman Empire
Battle of St Fagans 8 May - Parliamentarians defeat the Royalists.
Battle of Zusmarshausen 17 May – French and Swedish defeat Holy Roman Empire.
Battle of Korsuń 26 May - second major battle in Khmelnytsky uprising.
 Siege of Pembroke 31 May – 11 July - Parliamentarians defeat the Royalists.
Battle of Maidstone 1 June - Parliamentarians defeat the Royalists.
 Battle of Prague 25 July – 1 November - Sweden captures the left bank of Prague from the Habsburgs.
 Battle of Starokostiantyniv 26–28 July - Major Cossack defeat
 Battle of Preston 17 August – Cromwell defeats William Hamilton, 2nd Duke of Hamilton.
 Battle of Lens 20 August - France defeats Spain.
 Battle of Pyliavtsi 23 September - Cossack pyrrhic victory
 Recapture of Angola - Portuguese retake Angola from Dutch-Kongolese troops
 1649
 Battle of Mazyr 8–9 February - Polish forces capture Mazyr
 Second Battle of Guararapes 19 February – Portuguese forces defeat the Netherlands and conquer Pernambuco.
 Battle of Focchies 12 May – Venetians defeat Ottomans.
 Battle of Zahal 17–18 June - Polish victory over Cossacks.
 Siege of Zbarazh 10 July-22 August - Polish forces trapped in Zbarazh Castle
 First Battle of Loyew 31 July - Janusz Radziwił takes on two Cossack armies and wins.
 Battle of Rathmines 2 August – An army composed of Irish and Royalist soldiers is destroyed, paving the way for the Cromwellian conquest of Ireland.
 Battle of Zboriv 15–17 August - Liberated Polish troops trapped in Zbarazh Castle
 Destruction of Huronia – Force of 1200 armed Iroquois destroy Huron villages of St. Louis and St. Ignace near southern Georgian Bay, Canada, initiating Huron dispersal.
 1650
Battle of Macroom 10 May - England defeats Ireland.
Battle of Carbisdale 27 April - Covenanters defeat Scottish royalists.
Battle of Tecroghan 19 June - Inconclusive battle between the Parliamentarians and the Royalists and Irish.
Battle of Scarrifholis 21 June - Parliamentarians defeat the Irish.
Battle of Dunbar 3 September - England defeats Scotland.
Battle of Meelick Island 25 October - Parliamentarians defeat the Irish.
Battle of Hieton 1 December - England defeats Scotland.

Late 17th century (1651–1700)
 1651 –
Battle of Krasne 20–23 February - Poland defeats the Zaporozhian Cossacks.
Battle of Kopychyntsi 12 May - Lithuanians defeat Cossacks
Battle of Knocknaclashy June - England defeats Ireland.
Battle of Berestechko 28–30 June – Ukrainian rebels clash with the Polish army, in the largest battle of the 17th century.
Second Battle of Loyew 6 July - Poles push Cossacks out of Loyew.
Action of 10 July 1651 - Minor fighting in Cretan War 
Battle of Worcester 3 September – Cromwell defeats Royalists, Charles King of Scots escapes disguised as a servant.
Battle of Bila Tserkva 24–25 September - Poland defeats the Zaporozhian Cossacks and the Crimean Khanate.
 1652 –
 Battle of Bléneau (La Fronde) 7 April – Condé commands Fronds against French under Marshall Turenne, but the outcome is inconclusive.
 Battle of Dover 29 May – Clash between Blake's English and Tromp's Dutch fleets initiates First Anglo-Dutch War.
 Battle of Batih 1 - 2 June - Cossack victory over Poles, and subsequent massacre of Poles.
 Battle of Vezekény 25 August - Austria and Hungary defeat the Ottoman Empire.
 Battle of Plymouth First Anglo-Dutch War 26 August – De Ruyter's 36 men-of-war hold off Ayscue's 45 men-of-war, driving them away.
 Battle of Elba 28 August – Dutch victory over the English fleet
 Battle of the Kentish Knock (or Dover) 8 October – Blake beats back de With.
 Battle of Dungeness 10 December – Tromp defeats Blake during the First Anglo-Dutch War.
 1653 –
Battle of Portland 28 February – 2 March – Dutch admiral Tromp, outnumbered, loses a dozen men-of-war and 50 merchantmen to Blake.
 Battle of Livorno 13 March – Johan van Galen's ships defeat Bodley.
 Battle of Leghorn 14 March – Dutch naval victory over the English
 Battle of the Gabbard (or North Foreland) 12–13 June – English victory during the First Anglo-Dutch War
 Battle of Scheveningen (or Texel) 8–10 August – English victory during the First Anglo-Dutch War, Tromp killed
Battle of Arronches 8 November - Portugal defeats Spain.
Battle of Zhvanets - Cossacks surround Polish king.
 1654 –
 Recapture of Recife May 1652 - February 1654 - Portugal Captures Recife from The Netherlands.
 Action of 23 March 1654 – Portuguese having their 2 top officers killed still win the battle. Part of the Dutch–Portuguese War
 Action of 2 May 1654 – Battle near Colombo, Ceylon. Dutch defeat the Portuguese at sea.
 Battle of Perast 15 May - Venetian victory
 First Battle of the Dardanelles 16 May - First of Venetian attempts to capture Dardanelles
 Siege of Smolensk 6 July-16 September - Russia captures Smolensk
 Battle of Shklow 12 August - one of the first battles of the Russo-Polish War.
 Battle of Shepeleviche 24–25 August - one of the first battles of the Russo-Polish War.
 Battle of Arras 25 August – French defeat Spanish
 1655 –
Battle of Okhmativ 29 January-1 February - Russians join the Deluge. Poland-Lithuania and the Crimean Khanate defeat Russia.
Battle of the Severn 25 March - The Puritans of Providence, now Annapolis, Maryland defeat the forces of Cecil Calvert, 2nd Baron Baltimore.
Second Battle of the Dardanelles 21 June - Venetian victory over the Ottoman Empire.
Battle of Ujście 24–25 July - Sweden defeats Poland-Lithuania.
Battle of Vilnius 8 August - Russian-Cossack attack on Vilnius and defeat Poland-Lithuania.
Battle of Sobota 23 August - Sweden defeats Poland-Lithuania.
Battle of Żarnów 16 September – Swedish army defeats Polish during The Deluge.
First Battle of Kraków 25 September-13 October - Swedes capture Kraków from Poland-Lithuania.
Battle of Horodok 29 September - Russians defeat Poles and gain access to Lviv
Battle of Nowy Dwór 30 September – Swedish army defeats Polish during The Deluge.
Battle of Wojnicz 3 October - Swedish victory over Poland-Lithuania.
Battle of Częstochowa 18 November-27 December - Failed Swedish attack on Jasna Góra monastery in Poland-Lithuania.
Battle of Krosno 7 December- first major Polish victory over Sweden.
Siege of Danzig - 5 year Swedish siege on Poland
 1656 –
 Battle of Radom 2 February - Swedish victory
Battle of Gołąb 18/19 February - Swedish victory, although their troops came at different times.
Siege of Zamość 25 February-1 March - Poles hold Zamość
Battle of Jarosław 15 March - Poles hold Jaroslaw.
Battle of Sandomierz 24–26 March - Swedish king escapes Polish hands.
Battle of Nisko 28 March - Swedes capture Nisko
 Battle of Warka 7 April - first Polish success since the Swedish invasion
 Battle of Kłecko 7 May - Pyrrhic victory for the Swedes.
 Battle of Kcynia 1 June - Swedish victory
Battle of Tykocin 13 June - Swedish victory aided by Brandenburgers.
 Third Battle of the Dardanelles 26 June - Venice and Malta defeat Ottomans.
 First Battle of Warsaw 30 June – Poland retakes capital from Sweden.
 Second Battle of Warsaw 18–20 July – Charles X Gustavus of Sweden defeats Poland and is declared war upon by every country of significance in the Northern War.
 Siege of Dyneburg 18–31 July - Russians capture Daugavpils and massacre its defenders
 Storm of Kokenhusen 14 August - Russians capture a Latvian (then Swedish Livonia) fortress
 Siege of Riga 21 August-5 October - Swedes manage to hold Riga.
 Battle of Łowicz 25 August - Polish victory
 Battle of Lubrze 28 August - Polish hold Lubrze
Battle of Cádiz 9 September - England defeats Spain.
Battle of Prostken 8 October – Prince Bogusław Radziwiłł defeated by loyal Polish.
Battle of Filipów 22 October - Swedish-Prussian victory
Battle of Chojnice 25 December- Unknown timeline. Sweden defeats Poland.
 1657 –
Battle of Santa Cruz de Tenerife – 20 April - England defeats Spain.
Action of 3 May 1657 - Republic of Venice defeats Ottomans
Action of 18 May 1657 - Venetian victory
Battle of Walk – 8 July - Sweden defeats Russia.
Battle of Magierów 11 July - Poles defeat a Transylvanian-Cossack-Wallachian army.
Fourth Battle of the Dardanelles – 17–19 July Ottomans break Venetian blockade of the Straits.
Battle of Czarny Ostrów 20 July - Poles attack a Transylvanian camp and leave
Battle of Skałat 26 July - one of the final Tatar victories
Battle of Ängelholm 5 - 13 August - Denmark-Norway defeats Sweden.
Siege of Kraków July–August - Polish retake Krakow.
Battle of Genevadsbro 31 August - Sweden defeats Denmark-Norway.
Battle of Møn 12 - 13 September - Inconclusive naval battle between Denmark-Norway and Sweden.
Battle of Gdov – 16 September - Russia defeats Sweden.
Battle of Hjärtum 27 September - Denmark-Norway defeats Sweden.
Battle of Kattarp 3 October - Inconclusive battle between Denmark-Norway and Sweden.
Storming of Frederiksodde 24 October - Sweden captures Fredericia from Denmark-Norway.
Battle of Ocho Rios – 30 October - England defeats Spain.
1658 –
Battle of Tybrind Vig 30 January - Sweden defeats Denmark-Norway.
March Across the Belts 30 January - 15 February - Swedish victory over Denmark-Norway.
Battle of Szkudy 18 May - indecisive results between sweden and Poland-Lithuania.
Battle of Samugarh 29 May - Aurangzeb defeats Dara Shikoh and wins the Mughal throne 
Battle of the Dunes 14 June – English and French defeat Spanish at Dunkirk.
Battle of Rio Nuevo 25–27 June - England defeats Spain.
Battle of Verkiai 24 September - 11 October - stalemate in Russo-Polish War ends
Battle of the Sound 29 October - Dutch win naval battle against Swedes
Battle of Kolding 25 December – Poland and Denmark defeat Sweden.
 1659 –
 Battle of Khajwa 5 January - Aurangzeb takes total control of the Mughal Empire after defeating Shah Shuja.
 Battle at Elvas 14 January – Portuguese defeat Spain
 Assault on Copenhagen 11 February - Danes hold Copenhagen from Swedes.
 Battle of Myadel 8 May - Russian victory over Poland-Lithuania.
 Battle of Konotop 29 June - Cossacks under Ivan Vyhovsky defeat Russians.
 Battle of Ebeltoft 23 July - Swedish victory over Denmark-Norway and The Netherlands.
 Battle of Grudziądz 29 - 30 August - Polish victory over Sweden, but the town of Grudziądz was destroyed.
 Bakhtrioni uprising September - Kakheti uprising against Safavids.
 Battle of Pratapgarh 10 November – Marathas defeat Adilshahis and make major territorial gains.
 Battle of Nyborg 14 November - Final battle of Dano-Swedish War (1658–1660). The navies of Denmark-Norway, Brandenburg-Prussia, Poland-Lithuania and The Netherlands defeat Sweden.
 Battle of Kohlapur 28 December – Maratha warriors defeat Adilshahi forces.
 1660 –
 Battle of Polonka 29 June – Polish–Lithuanian army defeat Russians.
 Battle of Chudnov 14 October – 2 November – Polish–Lithuanian and Crimean Khanate army defeat Russian and Cossacks army.
 Siege of Lyakhavichy - Russians fail to capture a Lithuanian fortress.
 Battle of Lyubar - major Russian defeat
 Battle of Slobodyshche - Likely battle that was a precursor to Battle of Chudnov
 Battle of Basya - draw
 Battle of Pavan Khind - Marathas defeat Bijapur Sultanate.
 Battle of Chakan - Mughals mine out fort, force Marathas to surrender
 1661 –
 Battle of Umberkhind 3 February - Maratha early victory over Mughals.
 Action of 27 August 1661 - Venetian victory
 Siege of Fort Zeelandia 30 August– Ended the Dutch East India Company's rule over Taiwan
 Battle of Kushliki 4 November - Polish victory
 1662 Action of 29 September 1662 - Venetian ambush on Ottomans
 1663 Battle of Köbölkút - 6 Aug - Ottoman victory
 1664 – 
Siege of Hlukhiv January - one of the worst Polish defeats
Battle of Surat 6–10 January - Marathas defeat outnumbered Mughals
Siege of Nitra - Habsburg victory over Ottomans, forces under General de Souches recapture Nitra 
Siege of Novi Zrin 6 June - Ottoman victory, Novi Zrin is destroyed after its capture by the Ottomans
Battle of Stavishche July–October - Polish victory and one of the last battles of the Russo-Polish War (1654–1667).
Battle of Castelo Rodrigo 7 July
Siege of Léva 19 July - Habsburg victory over Ottomans, General de Souches recaptures Léva 
Djidjelli expedition 22 July - Algerians push out French forces
Battle of Saint Gotthard 1 August - The Holy Roman Empire and France defeat the Ottoman Empire.
 1665 –
 Action of March 1665 - French forces defeat Algerians
 Battle of Lowestoft 13 June – Battle during the Second Anglo-Dutch War. Biggest naval defeat in Dutch history.
 Battle of Montes Claros 17 June – Portuguese forces decisively defeat Spain in the last major battle of the Portuguese Restoration War
 Battle of Vågen 2 August – English fleet defeated by the Dutch without losing any ships.
 Battle of Ambuila (or Mbwila) 29 October – Portuguese forces defeat and kill king António I of Kongo, ending native rule of that kingdom.
 Battle of Purandar - The Marathas defeat the Mughal Empire.
 1666 –
 Four Days' Battle 1 - 4 June – One of the longest naval engagements in history ended up in a Dutch (led by Admiral Michiel de Ruyter) victory against the English.
 Battle of Mątwy 13 July - largest battle of Lubomirski's rebellion. Rebels defeat Poland-Lithuania.
 St. James's Day Battle aka Two Days' Battle 4 - 5 August – Another huge naval clash between England and the Netherlands. Close victory for England.
 1667 – 
 Raid on the Medway aka Battle of Chatham 19 - 24 June – England's largest naval defeat in history. A successful Dutch attack on English ships, in their main naval base Chatham, during the Second Anglo-Dutch War. The Dutch under command of Lieutenant-Admiral Michiel de Ruyter.
 Battle of Podhajce 6 - 16 October - Polish victory over Tatars
 1669 Battle of Cádiz 18–19 December - English defeat Algerians
 1670 - 
 Battle of Mbidizi River June - Portuguese victory killing Soyon leader
 Battle of Kitombo 18 October - Soyo-Ngoyo victory over Portuguese
 Fort Sinhagad captured by Marathas
 1671 –
 Battle of Saraighat – Ahoms, led by Lachit Borphukan, defeat Mughals, led by rajput Raja Ramsingh I, successfully defending Guwahati in the last major Mughal invasion of Assam in its history.
 1672 –
 Battle of Salher February - First pitched battle where Mughals lost to Marathas
 Action of 12 March 1672 - Dutch convoy escapes the English navy.
 Battle of Solebay 7 June – Naval battle between Dutch and English, England forced to abandon plans for a blockade.
 Siege of Groenlo (1672) 1 - 10 June – 10-day siege of the Dutch town of Groenlo by forces of France during the Franco-Dutch War. It ended in the town's surrender.
 Battle of Tolhuis 12 June - France defeats the Netherlands.
 Siege of Nijmegen 2 - 9 July - France captures Nijmegen from the Netherlands.
 Battle of Ładyżyn 18 July - Pyrrhic victory for the Poles against the Ottoman Empire.
 Siege of Groningen (1672) 9 July - 17 August – Dutch victory over the Prince-Bishopric of Münster, that ended all hope to push deeper into the Netherlands.
 Siege of Kamenets 18 - 27 August - Ottomans capture Kamienets from Poland-Lithuania.
 Battle of Krasnobród 5 - 6 October - Poles attack Tatars trying to capture Zamość
 Battle of Niemirów 7 - 8 October - Poles push out more Tatars
 Battle of Komarno 9 October - Poles push Tatars back to the Dniester
 Battle of Kruipin 12 October - France defeats the Netherlands.
 1673 –
 Battle of Saint-Lothain 25 February - Loyalists of the king of Spain of the County of Burgundy, commanded by Lacuzon, defeat pro-French rebels.
 First Battle of Schooneveld 7 June – Dutch naval victory over England and France.
 Siege of Maastricht (1673) 11 June – Key element in King Louis XIV's plans to attack the Netherlands
 Second Battle of Schooneveld 14–15 June – Dutch win naval battle, poor fighting on both sides.
 Battle of Texel 21 August – Dutch defeat English and French attempt at naval invasion.
 Siege of Naarden 6 - 13 September - The Netherlands aided by Spain liberate Naarden from France.
 Battle of Khotyn 11 November – Polish–Lithuanian Commonwealth forces defeat Ottoman Empire.
 Siege of Bonn (1673) 3 - 12 November - Dutch, Spanish and Imperial troops capture the capital Bonn from the Electorate of Cologne. French troops helped the Electorate defend its capital.
 1674 –
 Siege of Gray 23 - 28 February - France captures Gray from Spain.
 Battle of Scey-sur-Saône 2 March - Inconclusive battle between France and an army of the County of Burgundy fighting for the king of Spain.
 Battle of Chariez 3 March - Strategic victory of France against an army of the County of Burgundy.
 Battle of Ronas Voe 14 March – English defeat Dutch East India Company.
 Siege of Arbois 27 - 31 March - France fails to capture Arbois from a local army of the County of Burgundy.
 Battle of Orgelet 31 March - 1 April - Strategic victory of an army of the County of Burgundy against France.
 Siege of Besançon 26 April - 22 May - France captures Besançon from Spain.
 Siege of Dole 26 May - 6 June - France captures Dole from Spain.
 Battle of Sinsheim 16 June - France defeats the Holy Roman Empire.
 Siege of Salins 4 - 21 June - France captures Salins-les-Bains from Spain.
 Siege of Faucogney 3 - 4 July - France captures Faucogney-et-la-Mer from Spain.
 Battle of Fort Royal 20 July - The Netherlands fail to capture Fort Royal, present day Fort Saint Louis on Martinique, from France.
 Battle of Seneffe 11 August – The French attack a Dutch-Imperial-Spanish force in what would be one of the bloodiest battles of the century.
 Battle of Entzheim 4 October - Inconclusive battle between France and the Holy Roman Empire.
 Siege of Grave 25 July - 27 October - The Dutch recapture Grave from France after a difficult siege.
 Battle of Mulhouse 29 December - France defeats the Holy Roman Empire.
 1675 –
 Battle of Turckheim 5 January – France defeats Imperial and Prussian troops and reconquers Alsace.
 Battle of Stromboli 11 February - A French navy defeats Spain.
 Battle of Rathenow 16 June - Brandenburg-Prussia defeats Sweden.
 Battle of Nauen 27 June - Brandenburg-Prussia defeats Sweden.
 Battle of Fehrbellin 28 June – Swedes invade Brandenburg and lose.
 Battle of Salzbach 27 July - Inconclusive battle between the Holy Roman Empire and France.
 Battle of Altenheim 1 August - Inconclusive battle between France and the Holy Roman Empire.
 Battle of Konzer Brücke 11 August - The Holy Roman Empire defeats France.
 Battle of Lwów 24 August – Jan Sobieski defeats Turkish and Crimean Tatar forces.
 Battle of Trembowla 20 September - 11 October - Polish victory over the Ottoman Empire, heavily glorified
 Siege of Wismar 21 October - 13 December - Denmark-Norway captures Wismar from Sweden.
 Great Swamp Fight 16 December – English colonial forces in New England destroy the headquarters of the Narragansett during Metacom's or King Philip's War.
 1676 –
 Battle of Stromboli 6 January - Draw between the Dutch and French navy.
 Battle of Agosta 22 April – Draw between the French and Dutch navy. Dutch genius Admiral and naval hero Michiel de Ruyter gets wounded and dies a week later. The French retreat out of respect for the wounded Admiral.
 Battle of Bornholm 25 - 26 May – Naval battle between the fleet of Charles XI of Sweden, and a combined Danish and Dutch fleet. Allied victory.
 Battle of Öland 1 June – Danish-Dutch fleet defeats Swedish fleet in the Baltic Sea during the Scanian War.
 Battle of Palermo 2 June - France defeats Dutch and Spanish navies.
 Battle of Vänersborg 25 - 26 June - Denmark-Norway defeats Sweden.
 Battle of Ystad 28 June - Denmark-Norway and the Netherlands defeat Sweden.
 Siege of Landskrona 5 July - 3 August - Denmark-Norway captures Landskrona from Sweden.
 Battle of Hunneberg July - Denmark-Norway defeats Sweden.
 Siege of Kristianstad 10 - 15 August - Denmark-Norway captures Kristianstad from Sweden.
 Battle of Halmstad 17 August - Sweden defeats Denmark-Norway.
 Siege of Maastricht 6 June - 27 August - The Netherlands and Spain lift the siege of Maastricht, after the advance of a French relieve army.
 Siege of Philippsburg 23 June - 17 September - The Holy Roman Empire captures Philippsburg from France.
 Battle of Gegodog 13 October – Trunajaya rebellion defeats forces loyal to the Mataram Sultanate
 Battle of Żurawno 25 September - 14 October - Final battle of the Polish–Ottoman War (1672–1676).
 Battle of Lund 4 December – Swedish troops defeat the Danish ones in the bloodiest battle in Scandinavian history with over 9,000 dead (about 50% losses on both sides).
 1677 –
 Siege of Kristianopel 11 - 25 February - Sweden captures Kristianopel from Denmark-Norway.
 Action of March 1677 3 March - The Dutch navy defeats France near Tobago.
 Siege of Karlshamn 1 - 8 March - Sweden captures Karlshamn from Denmark-Norway.
 Siege of Valenciennes 28 February - 17 March - France captures Valenciennes from Spain.
 Battle of Cassel 11 April – French victory under Philippe I, Duke of Orléans, against the Dutch under William III of Orange, stadtholder of the Netherlands
 Siege of Cambrai 20 March - 19 April - France captures Cambrai from Spain.
 Battle of Surabaya 4 - 13 May – Dutch East India Company defeats the Trunajaya rebellion on behalf of the Mataram Sultanate
 Battle of Møn 31 May - The navy of Denmark-Norway defeats Sweden.
 Battle of Malmö 11 June - 5 July – Swedish victory over Denmark
 Battle of Landskrona 14 July – Swedish victory over Denmark
 Battle of Køge Bay 1 - 2 July - Greatest naval victory in Danish history. Denmark-Norway and the Netherlands defeat Sweden.
 Battle of Marstrand 6 - 23 July – Danish-Norwegian victory over Sweden
 Battle of Uddevalla 28 August – Danish victory over Sweden
 Battle of Kokersberg 7 October - Inconclusive battle between France and the Holy Roman Empire
 Siege of Freiburg 9 - 16 November - France captures Freiburg im Breisgau from Austria and the Imperial army.
 Siege of Stettin 25 June - 15 December - Brandenburg-Prussia, Denmark-Norway and the Duchy of Brunswick-Lüneburg capture Stettin, Szczecin from Sweden.
 1678 –
 Battle of Warksow 18 January - Sweden defeats Denmark-Norway and Brandenburg-Prussia.
 Siege of Ypres 18 - 25 March - France captures Ypres from Spain.
 Battle of Rheinfelden 6 July - France defeats the Holy Roman Empire.
 Siege of Bohus Fortress 4 June - 21 July - Sweden captures Bohus Fortress from Denmark-Norway.
 Battle of Ortenbach 23 July - France defeats the Holy Roman Empire.
 Siege of Kristianstad October 1677 - 4 August 1678 - Sweden captures Kristianstad from Denmark-Norway.
 Battle of Saint Denis 15 August – Last battle of the Franco-Dutch War. Inconclusive battle between France and an army of the Netherlands and Spain.
 Siege of Stralsund 20 September - 15 October - Brandenburg-Prussia captures Stralsund from Sweden.
 Capture of Kediri 25 November – After weeks of marching, an allied Mataram–Dutch force took Kediri, the stronghold of Trunajaya rebellion by assault
 1679 –
 Battle of Telšiai 7 February - Strategic victory of Brandenburg-Prussia against Sweden.
 Battle of Bhupalgarh 2 April - Mughal victory over the Marathas.
 Battle of Drumclog 1 June – Part of the Scottish Covenanter Wars. Covenanters defeat the Royalists.
 Battle of Bothwell Bridge 22 June – Part of the Scottish Covenanter Wars. Royalists defeat the Covenanters.
 Battle of Sangamner - Mughal victory over the Marathas.
1680 
Battle of Manacaud -Part of wars involving Mughal Empire
1681 Battle of Katole 4 September - Portuguese victory
1682
First Bombardment of Algiers - French bombing of Algiers during the French-Algerian War.
Battle of Trichinopoly - Maratha victory against Mysoreans.
Battle of Kalyan - Mughal victory
1683 
Battle of Vienna 12 September – The Holy Roman Empire and the Polish–Lithuanian Commonwealth defeat an Ottoman army and lift the siege of Vienna.
Battle of Párkány 7–9 October
Second Bombardment of Algiers - French bombing of Algiers which freed French captives.
 1684
Battle of Vác 27 June
Siege of Visegrád - Holy Roman Empire captures Visegrád
First Battle of Buda - HRE attempts to siege Buda, but fails
Siege of Santa Maura - Venetian forces successfully capture Castle of Santa Maura
1685 
Battle of Sedgemoor – James II of England's forces defeat those of the Duke of Monmouth, ending the Monmouth Rebellion.
Siege of Bijapur - Mughals annex all territory under the Adil Shahi dynasty.
Battle on Vrtijeljka - Ottomans capture Cetinje.
Battle of Eperjes - HRE defeats Ottomans at Prešov
Battle of Kassa - HRE defeats Ottomans at Košice
 1686
 Battle of Buda 18 June-9 September – The forces of the Holy League of 1684 liberate Buda from Ottoman Turkish rule.
 Battle of Bhangani 18 September - Sikh victory
 Siege of Pécs 14–22 October - Imperial victory, the Austrians capture Pécs after battling in Buda.
 1687 
 Second Battle of Mohács 12 August – Charles of Lorraine defeats Ottomans.
 Siege of Athens – Venetians temporarily take city from Ottomans before being forced to retreat. Major damage to the Parthenon.
 Siege of Golconda - Mughal emperor Aurangzeb annexes Qutb Shahi dynasty.
 Crimean campaigns of 1687 and 1689 - Crimeans retain independence, but Ottoman expansion fails.
 1688 –
 Third Bombardment of Algiers 26 June - French bombing of Algiers after Algerian pirates broke a treaty.
 First Siege of Belgrade 30 July - 6 September - Holy Roman Empire captures Belgrade from the Ottoman Empire.
 Battle of Bhangani 18 September – The Sikhs under Guru Gobind Singh defeats Hari Chand's Hill Raja forces.
 Battle of Fort Albany September – French forces engage and defeat British relief forces in Hudson Bay.
 Siege of Negroponte (1688) 13 July - 21 October - Venice fails to capture Negroponte from Ottomans.
 Siege of Philippsburg 27 September - 30 October - France captures Philippsburg from the Bishopric of Speyer. Philippsburg was defended by German troops.
 Battle of Reading 9 December – William III of England's forces defeat those of James II in the only battle of the Glorious Revolution.
 1689 
Battle of Uerdingen 12 March - The Netherlands and Brandenburg-Prussia defeat France.
Break of Dromore 14 March - The Army of James II (Jacobites) defeats the army of William III (Williamites).
Battle of Bantry Bay 11 May – France defeats the English fleet near the Irish southern coast.
Battle of Killiecrankie 27 July - Jacobites defeat the Wiliamites.
Battle of Newtownbutler 31 July - The Williamites defeat the Jacobites.
Siege of Derry 18 April - 1 August - The Jacobites fail to capture Derry from the Williamites.
Battle of Dunkeld 21 August - Williamites defeat the Jacobites.
Battle of Walcourt 25 August – An Anglo-Dutch force defeats a French army. 
Battle of Batočina 29–30 August - Holy Roman Empire defeats the Ottoman Empire.
Siege of Mainz 26 July - 8 September - The Holy Roman Empire recaptures Mainz from France.
Battle of Niš 24 September - Holy Roman Empire captures Niš from the Ottoman Empire.
Siege of Bonn July - 12 October - Brandenburg-Prussia and the Netherlands capture Bonn from the Electorate of Cologne. The electorate was aided by France.
Austrian campaign for Skopje 26 October - Austrians burn down Skopje 
Siege of Larache August - 11 November - Morocco takes Larache from Spain.
Battle of Raigarh - Mughals conquer fortress from the Marathas, but Rajaram I escapes. 
 1690 –
Battle of Cavan 11 February - Williamites defeat the Jacobites.
Battle of Cromdale 30 April - 1 May - Williamites defeat the Jacobites.
Battle of Chedabucto 3 June - England defeats France.
Battle of Fleurus 1 July – The French troops, under the command of Louis XIV's marshal Montmorency, defeat a coalition formed by England, Spain, the Dutch Republic and the Holy Roman Empire.
Battle of the Boyne 1 July – William of Orange defeats James II of England.
Battle of Beachy Head 10 July – French defeat the English fleet under command of Admiral Arthur Herbert, 1st Earl of Torrington in the War of the League of Augsburg.
Siege of Athlone 17-24 July - Williamites and The Netherlands fail to capture Athlone from the Jacobites and France.
Battle of Zernest 11 August - Ottomans halt HRE forces from expanding.
Battle of Staffarda 18 August - French defeat Spaniards and Savoyans.
Battle of Mytilene 8 September - inconclusive naval battle between Venice and the Ottoman Empire.
Siege of Limerick August - September - Williamites fail to capture Limerick from the Jacobites and France.
Siege of Jinji September 1690 - 8 January 1698 - Marathas and Madurai Nayaks defeat Mughals, but Mughals capture the fort
Second Siege of Belgrade 2-8 October - Ottomans recapture Belgrade from Austria.
Battle of Quebec 16–24 October – British victory over France during King William's War.
 1691 –
Siege of Mons 15 March - 10 April - France captures Mons from Spain.
Siege of Athlone June - The Williamites and the Netherlands capture Athlone from the Jacobites and France.
Battle of Aughrim 22 July – The bloodiest battle in Irish history and a Jacobite defeat against the Williamites.
Battle of La Prairie 11 August – French repulse British and First Nations' attack on this settlement.
Battle of Slankamen 19 August – Louis of Baden defeats Ottoman Turks.
Battle of Leuze 18 September – Famous French cavalry victory in the Nine Years' War against a superior Anglo-Dutch force.
Battle of Nadaun - Rajput-Sikh victory over the Mughal Empire.
 1692 –
Battles of Barfleur and La Hogue 29 May – French lose 15 ships to England.
Battle of Moulouya May - Ottoman Algeria defeats Morocco. Failed Alaouite Moroccan attempt to conquer Tlemcen.
 Siege of Namur 25 May – 1 July – Louis XIV takes Namur from a coalition of Spaniards, Dutch and Imperial troops.
 Battle of Steenkerque 3 August – French victory against England, Scotland, Denmark and the United Provinces.
Battle of Placentia 16–21 September - France defeats England.
 1693 –
Battle of Lagos 27 June – Near Portugal Comte de Tourville avenges La Hougue by defeating the Anglo-Dutch fleet.
Siege of Oran 20–24 July - Moroccan troops fail to take Oran from Spain.
Battle of Neerwinden 29 July – duc de Luxembourg defeats England, The Netherlands and Spain.
Battle of Marsaglia 4 October - France defeats Savoy and Spain.
 1694 –
Battle of Torroella 27 May – The French Navy defeats Spain
Battle of Texel 29 June - France wins a naval battle over the Netherlands.
Battle of Hodów 11 July -  Poland-Lithuania defeats the Crimean Khanate.
Battle of Camaret 18 July – Failed Anglo-Dutch attack to seize the French port of Brest and to destroy part of the French fleet stationed there
Battle of Slankamen 19 August - Austria defeats the Ottoman Empire and conquers most of Croatia.
Siege of Tunis August–November - Tunis is inducted into Algiers
Battle of Ustechko 6 October - Poland-Lithuania defeats the Crimean Khanate and the Ottoman Empire.
 1695 
Battle of the Oinousses Islands 9–15 February - The Ottoman navy defeats Venice.
Battle of Sant Esteve d'en Bas 10 March - Spain defeats France.
Siege of Namur 2 July – 4 September – William III of Orange and Coehoorn recapture the place, commanding a coalition of England, Scotland, The Netherlands and German states against France.
Battle of Lugos 25 September - The Ottoman Empire defeats Germany.
Azov campaigns Spring 1695 - 19 July 1996 - Multiple Russian campaigns aimed at capturing the Turkish fort of Azov For.
 1696
 Battle of Ch'ich' 2 February - Itza defeat Spanish
Battle of Dogger Bank 17 June - France defeats the Netherlands in a naval battle.
Battle of Ulaş 20–26 August - The Ottoman Empire defeats Austria.
Battle of Andros 22 August - Indecisive battle between a Venetian-Papal navy and an Ottoman navy.
 Battle of Cenei 26 August - Ottoman victory over Austria.
1697 
Siege of Ath 16 May - 5 June - France captures Ath from Spain.
Action of 6 July 1697 - Venetian fleet hunts down Turkish fleet
Siege of Barcelona 12 June - 12 August - France captures Barcelona from Spain.
Battle of Hudson's Bay 5 September - France defeats England.
Battle of Zenta 11 September – Prince Eugene of Savoy defeats Ottoman Turkish forces
Siege of Nojpetén Spanish take Itza city.
 1698
Battle of Podhajce 8–9 September
Battle of Samothrace 20 September
1699 
Battle of Satara - Mughal victory
Constantine campaign - Tunisia captures most of Eastern Algeria
1700 –
Siege of Riga On 22 February and on 15 June
Siege of Tönning March–August - failed siege by Swedes
Battle of Reinbek 19 May - lifts Siege of Tönning
Landing at Humlebæk 24 July - First Swedish offensive during Great Northern War
Battle of Jouami' al-Ulama 3 Oct - Algerians defeat Tunisians
Battle of Varja 27 Oct - first battle in Swedish Estonia during Great Northern War
Battle of Valkininkai 18 November – Sapieha clan is defeated by the opposing noble coalition during the Lithuanian Civil War.
Battle of Narva 30 November – Charles XII of Sweden defeats Russians during the Great Northern War.
First Battle of Anandpur - Sikh victory

Early 18th century (1701–1750)
 1701 
 Battle of Petschora 12 Feb - Swedes defeat Russians
 Battle of Chelif 28 April - Ottoman Algerian victory over Morocco.
 Battle of Carpi 9 July - Austrian victory over France.
 Crossing of the Düna 19 July – Charles XII crosses the Düna during the Great Northern War in a battle against Saxony, the Duchy of Courland and Russia.
 Battle of Chiari 1 Sept - Austrian victory over France, Spain and Savoy.
 Battle of Rauge 4 Sept - Swedes defeat Russians
 Battle of Tryškiai 4-5 Dec - Swedish victory over Poland-Lithuania.
 Battle of Khelna 26 Dec - Mughal victory after a 3-month siege over the Marathas.
 Battle of Erastfer 29 Dec - First significant Russian victory in Great Northern War over Sweden.
 Second Battle of Anandpur - Sikh victory over rajas of the Sivalik Hills.
 1702 –
 Battle of Cremona 1 February – Indecisive action between Austria and France
 Battle of Darsūniškis 13 March - Lithuanian victory over Swedes
 Battle of Vilnius 5 Apr - Swedes capture Vilnius from Poland-Lithuania.
 Siege of Kaiserswerth 18 April - 15 June - Austria, Prussia and the Netherlands capture Kaiserswerth from the Electorate of Cologne. Kaiserswerth was defended by France.
 Battle of Klissow 19 July – Sweden defeats a combined Saxon and Polish army during the Great Northern War.
 Battle of Santa Vittoria 26 July - French victory over Austria.
 Battle of Hummelshof 30 July – Russia defeats Sweden during the Great Northern War.
 Battle of Luzzara 15 August - Inconclusive battle between Austria and a French-Savoyard coalition.
 Action of August 1702 19-25 August - Inconclusive naval battle between France and England.
 Siege of Landau 16 June - 12 September - Austria captures Landau from France.
 Siege of Nöteborg 26 Sept - major Russian victory over Sweden.
 Battle of Cádiz 23 August - 30 September - Bourbon Spain defeats England and the Netherlands.
 Battle of Friedlingen 14 October – France defeats Holy Roman Empire during War of the Spanish Succession.
 Battle of Vigo Bay 23 October – English and Dutch forces capture a defended harbor and part of the silver from a Spanish-French treasure fleet.
 Battle of Flint River October - England and the Apalachicola people defeat Pro-Bourbon Spain and the Apalachee.
 Siege of St. Augustine 10 November - 30 December - England fails to capture St. Augustine, Florida from Spain.
 Battle of the Yi - Battle between Spanish Argentina and indigenous groups.
 Battle of Basoli - SIkhs defeat Mughals
 Battle of Nirmohgarh - Sikh victory over the Mughal Empire.
 First Battle of Chamkaur - precursor to Battle of Chamkaur, Sikh victory over the Mughal Empire.
 1703
 Battle of Werbicze 4 February - Polish-Lithuanian victory over rebel cossacks.
 Battle of Saločiai 18 March - Swedish victory over Poland-Lithuania and Russia.
 Battle of Schmidmühlen 28 March - Bavaria defeats Austria.
 Battle of Pułtusk 20 April - Swedish victory over Saxony.
 Siege of Guadeloupe 19 March - 15 May - England fails to conquer Guadeloupe from France.
 Battle of Cap de la Roque 22 May - France defeats the Netherlands in a naval battle.
 Siege of Thorn May–October 14- Swedes capture Toruń from Poland-Lithuania, defended by Saxon troops of king Augustus II the Strong of Poland, elector of Saxony.
 Battle of Ekeren 30 June - Battle between the Netherlands and a French-Spanish coalition. Both sides claimed victory.
 Battle of Systerbäck 8 July - Russians defeat Swedes
 Battle of Falmouth 10 - 19 August - France defeats England.
 First Battle of Höchstädt 30 September - French and Bavarian victory over Austria.
 Battle of Speyerbach 15 November - France defeats the Landgraviate of Hesse-Kassel and the Electoral Palatinate.
 Battle of Zvolen 15 November - Kuruc victory. The Hungarians under Kuruc were aided by France and fought against Austria, Denmark-Norway, Vojvodian Serbs and Hungarian royalists, defending the Habsburg-Austrian king of Hungary.
 Battle of Raigarh 1703-1704 - Mughals reconquer Rajgad Fort from the Marathas.
 1704 –
Raid on Deerfield 29 February - French and Iroquois defeat and massacre Brits
Siege of Wagingera 27 March - Mughal victory over the Ramoshi.
Battle of Biskupice 21 April - Hungarian rebel victory over Austria.
Landing at Barcelona 27–30 May - Failed attempt by England, the Netherlands and pro-Habsburg Spain to capture Barcelona from Bourbons.
Battle of Koroncó 13 June - Austrians repress Kuruc rebels
Battle of Wesenberg 15 June - Russians capture Rakvere from Sweden.
Raid on Grand Pré 24–26 June - English defeat Miꞌkmaq
Second Battle of Narva 27 June - Russia captures Narva from Sweden. Ends in Treaty of Narva.
Battle of Schellenberg 2 July – Duke of Marlborough defeats French and Bavarian forces during War of the Spanish Succession.
Battle of Jakobstadt 25 July - Swedish victory over Poland-Lithuania and Russia.
Capture of Gibraltar 1–4 August - Brits and Dutch capture Gibraltar
Battle of Poznań 8 August - Swedish victory over Saxony and Poland-Lithuania.
 Battle of Blenheim 14 August – Duke of Marlborough defeats French and Bavarian forces during War of the Spanish Succession.
 Battle of Málaga 24 August - Indecisive naval battle between an anglo-Dutch coalition and France.
Battle of Lemberg – 6 September Swedish Empire defeats the Polish-Lithuanian Commonwealth.
Battle of Poniec 28 October - Inconclusive battle between Sweden and Saxony.
Battle of Sarsa 21 December - Mughals defeat Sikhs trying to cross river.
Battle of Torna - Mughal victory over the Marathas.
 1705 –
 Siege of Colonia del Sacramento End of 1704 - February 1705 - Spain captures Colónia do Sacramento from Portugal.
 Battle of Cabrita Point 21 March - Ended Twelfth siege of Gibraltar. England, Portugal and the Netherlands defeat France and Spain in a naval battle.
 Siege of Gibraltar September 1704 - 3 May 1705 - Pro-Bourbon Spain and France fail to capture Gibraltar from England, the Netherlands, Austria and Pro-Habsburg Spain.
 Battle of Elixheim 18 July - Allied victory. England, Scotland, the Netherlands and Austria defeat France.
 Battle of Gemauerthof 26 July – Sweden defeats Russia during the Great Northern War.
 Battle on the Congost 29 July - Pro-Habsburg Catalans defeat a pro-Bourbon Spanish army.
 Battle of Warsaw (1705) 31 July – Sweden defeats Saxon and Polish troops near Warsaw during the Great Northern War.
 Battle of Cassano 16 August - Inconclusive battle of France versus Austria, Prussia and Savoy.
 First Battle of Hogland 20 August - Swedes capture Hogland Island from Russia.
 Battle of Montjuïc 13–17 September - Grand Alliance of Austria, England-Scotland, the Netherlands and Catalonia defeats Spain and France.
 Battle of Praga 14 October - Swedish victory over Poland-Lithuania, Saxony and Russia.
 Siege of Barcelona 14 September - 19 October - England, Austria, Portugal, the Netherlands and pro-Habsburg Spain capture Barcelona from pro-Bourbon Spain.
 Battle of Zsibó 15 November - Kuruc and French defeat by an army of Austria, Denmark-Norway and Vojvodian Serbs.
 Battle of Chamkaur 6 December - Mughal victory over the Khalsa Sikhs.
 Battle of Saint Gotthard 13 December - Kuruc-Hungarian victory over Austria.
 Sendling's night of murder 25 December - Austria massacres an army of Bavarian peasants, during the Austrian occupation of Bavaria.
 Battle of Muktsar 29 December - Wazir Khan of the Mughal Empire was defeated by Khalsa Sikhs.
 1706 –
Siege of Nice 15 March 1705 - 4 January 1706 - France captures Nice from Savoy.
First Battle of Grodno 15 January - Sweden defeats Russia. Swedes capture and hold Grodno for two years.
Battle of Fraustadt 13 February – Sweden defeats Saxony during the Great Northern War.
Battle of Valkininkai 24 February - Swedish victory over Poland-Lithuania and Russia.
 Siege of Barcelona 3 April – Battle during the War of the Spanish Succession. Allied victory. England, Austria, the Netherlands and Spanish troops loyal to the Habsburg dynasty maintain Barcelona from France and Spanish troops loyal to the Bourbon dynasty.
 Battle of Calcinato 19 Apil - French-Bourbon-Spanish victory over Austria and Prussia.
 Battle of Kletsk 19 April - Swedish victory over Russia.
 Battle of Ramilles or Battle of Ramillies 23 May – Duke of Marlborough, commanding an army of England, Scotland and the Netherlands, defeats the French in the War of Spanish Succession.
 Siege of Ostend 15 June - Allied victory. The Netherlands and England capture Ostend from France and Bourbon Spain.
 Battle of Murcia 4 September - Bourbon-Spanish victory over England and the Netherlands.
 Battle of Turin 7 September – French and Spanish siege fails during War of the Spanish Succession. The capital of Savoy holds. The Savoyards were aided by Austria and Prussia.
 Battle of Castiglione 8 September - French defeat Hessians
Battle of El Albujón 21 September Spanish loyal to Philip V of Spain defeat forces loyal to Charles VI.
Lefebvre's Charles Town expedition September - Failed French attempt to capture Charleston, South Carolina from England.
Battle of Kalisz 29 October Warsaw Confederation defeats Saxony and Russia.
Battle of Santa Cruz de Tenerife 6 November – Spain defeats small British fleet.
 1707 
 Battle of Biniatap 5 January - Pro-Bourbon Spain and france defeats Pro-Habsurg Spain.
 Battle of Almansa 25 April – French and Spanish forces defeat a British and Portuguese army.
 Action of 2 May 1707 2 May - French victory over Great Britain in a naval battle.
 Siege of Xàtiva 8 May - 6 June - Castile and France capture Xàtiva from Aragon and Great Britain.
 Siege of Toulon 29 July - 21 August - Austria, Savoy and Great Britain fail to capture Toulon from France.
 Siege of Port Royal 6 June - 1 September - Two failed attempts by Great Britain to conquer Port-Royal (Acadia) from France.
 Battle at The Lizard 21 October - French victory over Great Britain in a naval battle.
 Siege of Oran 1 November 1707 - 4 April 1708 - Ottoman Algeria captures Oran from Spain.
 Siege of Pensacola 12 August - 30 November - Two failed attempts by the Muscogee in British service to capture Pensacola, Florida from Spain.
 1708 –
Second Battle of Grodno 27 January - Swedes recapture Grodno from Russia.
Wager's Action 8 June - Great Britain forces the Spanish treasure fleet to retreat to Cartagena.
Battle of Holowczyn 4 July – Swedish defeat two Russian forces during the Great Northern War.
 Battle of Oudenarde 11 July – Duke of Marlborough and Prince Eugene of Savoy defeat French and besiege Lille.
 Battle of Trenčín 3 August - Habsburg push back Kurucs
 Battle of the Neva 29 August - Swedes defeat Russians
 Raid on Haverhill 29 August - French-Algonquian victory over Great Britain.
Battle of Malatitze – 10 September Russian Empire defeats Sweden.
Battle of Rajovka – 20 September - Inconclusive battle between Sweden and Russia.
Battle of Koporye 27 September - Swedish victory over Russia.
Battle of Lesnaya – 28 September – Swedish routed by the Russians after snowstorm starts during the Great Northern War.
Battle of Wijnendale 28 September – General Webb defeats the French near Torhout who wanted to stop the siege of Rijsel.
Evacuation of Kolkanpää 16 October - Russians push back Swedes
Sack of Baturyn 27 Oct-2 Nov - Russians take Cossack Baturyn and massacre its population
Battle of Desna 31 October - Swedish victory over Russia.
Battle of Koniecpol 21 November - supporters of Augustus II the Strong defeat supporters of Stanisław Leszczyński
Siege of Lille 12 August - 10 December - The Netherlands, Great Britain and Austria capture Lille from France.
Siege of Veprik 23 December - Swedish forces capture Vepryk from Russia.
Laghouat Expedition - Morocco gains control of towns near Laghouat
 1709 –
 Battle of St. John's 1 January - French take control of St. John's, Newfoundland and Labrador from Great Britain.
 Battle of Oposhnya 28 January - Swedish victory over Russia.
 Battle of Krasnokutsk–Gorodnoye 10 February - Swedish victory over Russia.
 Battle of São Salvador 15 February - Orthodox Kongolese Catholics defeat Antonian Catholics
 Battle of Sokolki 12 April - Sweden lets the Russian army escape, precursor to Battle of Poltava.
 Siege of Alicante 3 December 1708 - 20 April 1709 - Pro-Bourbon Spain and France capture Alicante from Aragon and Great Britain.
 Battle of La Gudiña 7 May - Spain defeats Portugal and Great Britain.
 Battle of Fort Albany 26 June - Great Britain defeats France.
Battle of Poltava 28 June – Peter I of Russia of Russia defeats Charles XII of Sweden during the Great Northern War.
Surrender at Perevolochna 30 June - The entire Swedish navy surrenders to the Russians.
Battle of Malplaquet 11 September – Prince of Savoy and Duke of Marlborough defeat the French in the largest battle of the 18th century, though at a terrible cost.
Battle of Samana 26 November - Sikhs defeat the Mughal Empire.
Battle of Sonipat - Sikh victory over the Mughal Empire.
 1710 –
 Battle of Helsingborg 10 March – Sweden defeats invading Danish force during the Great Northern War.
 Siege of Viborg March - Russians capture Vyborg from Sweden.
 Battle of Chappar Chiri 12 May - Sikhs defeat the Mughal Empire. Sikhs control from Lahore to Delhi.
 Siege of Sirhind 14 May - Sikhs capture Sirhind from the Mughal Empire and establish it as the Sikh capital.
 Capitulation of Estonia and Livonia 15 July - Swedish Estonia and Livonia become incorporated into Russia.
 Battle of Almenar 27 July – Austrian-British-Dutch allies defeat the Spanish in the War of Spanish Succession.
 Battle of Saragossa 20 August – Important allied victory in the War of Spanish Succession. Austria, Habsburg Spain, Great Britain, the Netherlands and Portugal defeat Bourbon Spain.
 First Battle of Rio de Janeiro 19 September - Portugal defeats French incursion
 Battle of Køge Bay 24 September - Indecisive between Sweden and Denmark-Norway.
 Battle of Rahon 11 October - Sikh victory over the Mughal Empire.
 Siege of Port Royal 5-13 October - Great Britain captures Port Royal and Acadia from France.
 Battle of Syracuse 9 November - Naval battle. France defeats Great Britain.
 Battle of Brihuega 9 December – The duke of Vendôme surprises and defeats a British force.
 Battle of Villaviciosa 10 December – Decisive victory of a Franco-Spanish army on retreating Austrian, Dutch and Portuguese forces.
 Battle of Lohgarh 16 December  - Sikh victory over the Mughal Empire.
 Pruth River campaign – Ottoman Turks defeat Peter I of Russia.
 Battle of Sadhaura - Sikhs capture Sadaura from the Mughal Empire.
 Battle of Jalalabad - Mughals hold Jalalabad against the Sikhs.
 1711 –
 Battle of Ain Dara 20 March – battle between the Qaysi and Yamani tribes of Ottoman Druze. Qaysi victory.
First Battle of Bloody Creek mid-June – French-allied Indians successfully ambush British troops.
Capture of the galleon San Joaquin 11 August - Brits capture a Spanish ship
 Quebec Expedition 22 August– British failed attack against France during Queen Anne's War
Siege of Bouchain 5 August - 12 September - Great Britain, the Netherlands and Austria capture Bouchain from France.
Battle of Rio de Janeiro 12-22 September 1711 - France defeats Portugal.
Battle of Wismar 5 December - Danish victory over Sweden.
Siege of Stralsund 1711 - 24 December 1715 - Denmark-Norway, Saxony, Russia and Prussia capture Stralsund from Sweden.
 1712 –
 Cassard expedition – French voyage to raid the Dutch South American colonial outposts, and British colonies
 Battle of Jammu 22 January - Mughals defeat Sikhs
 Battle of Fladstrand 11 April - Inconclusive
 Battle of Denain 24 July – French defeat Austrians and Dutch.
 Action of 31 July 1712 - Inconclusive
 Action of 17 August 1712 - Danish victory
 Battle of Gadebusch 9 December – Sweden defeats Denmark and Saxony during the Great Northern War.
 1713
 Skirmish at Bender 1 February - Ottomans kick out Swedes from Moldavia
 Battle of Fort Neoheroka 20–23 March - Major Tuscarora defeat against the British.
 Battle of Torredembarra 16 July - Pro-Bourbon Spain and France defeat Catalonia.
 Second Battle of Hogland 22 July - Russians defeat Swedes
 Siege of Landau 11 June - 21 August - France captures the Free imperial city of Landau in der Pfalz from the Holy Roman empire, Germany.
 Battle of Pälkäne 17 October - Russian victory over Sweden.
 Second Battle of Tönning - Danish-Russian-Saxon victory over Sweden and Holstein-Gottorp.
 1714 –
 Battle of Arbúcies 14 January - Catalonia defeats Pro-Bourbon Spain and France.
 Battle of Balsareny 14 January - Catalonia defeats Pro-Bourbon-Spain and France.
 Battle of La Gleva 3 February - Pro-Bourbon-Spain and France defeat Catalonia.
 Naval battle of Barcelona 24 February - Catalonia defeats Great Britain.
 Battle of Napue 19 February-2 March - Russian victory over Sweden.
 Battle of Storkyro 2 March – Swedish army defeated by Russia during the Great Northern War.
 Battle of Manresa 7 May - Catalonia defeats Pro-Bourbon Spain and France.
 Battle of Gangut 7 August – Swedish fleet defeated by much larger Russian fleet during the Great Northern War.
 Battle of Talamanca 13 and 14 August - Catalonia defeats Pro-Bourbon Spain and France.
 Siege of Barcelona 25 July 1713 - 11 September 1714 - Pro-Bourbon Spain and France capture Barcelona from Pro-Habsburg Spain and Catalonia.
 1715 –
Battle of Gurdas Nangal 1 April - 7 December - End of Banda Singh Bahadur's empire
Battle of Fehmarn 24 April - Danish victory
Battle of Pilsud 10 May - Jaipuri victory
Battle of Rügen 8 August - Indecisive
Skirmish of Dunfermline 24 October - Jacobite troops defeated
Skirmish of Alness October - Jacobite victory
Battle of Preston 9–14 November – Rebel victory during First Jacobite rising
 Battle of Sheriffmuir 13 November – Duke of Argyll defeated, but manages to withdraw.
 Battle of Stresow 16 November - Coalition victory
 Siege of Gurdaspur - siege that sees the end of Banda Singh Bahadur
 1716 –
 Battle of Høland 9 March - Swedish victory
 Battle of Dynekilen 8 July – Swedish fleet defeated by Dano-Norwegian naval forces.
 Action of 8 July 1716 - Indecisive
 Battle of Petrovaradin 5 August – Austria defeats the Ottomans.
 1717 – 
Battle of Trnjine April – Montenegrin victory over much larger Ottoman forces commanded by Durmish Pasha attempting breakthrough to Montenegro.
Battles at Göta Älv 2 May-27 September - Swedish victory
Battle of Gothenburg 13–14 May - Swedes hold Gothenburg
Battle of Imbros 12–16 June - Indecisive
Battle of Strömstad 19 July - Swedish victory
Battle of Matapan 19 July - Ottomans capture Morea
Siege of Belgrade 18 June-21 August – Monthlong siege during the Austro-Venetian-Ottoman war. Austrian victory.
Spanish conquest of Sardinia 22 August-30 October - Spain conquers Sardinia
Omani invasion of Bahrain - The Sultanate of Oman invades Bahrain, ending 155 years of Safavid rule.
1718
Siege of Charlestown May – The pirate Blackbeard holds Charleston's harbor hostage until his ransoms are met.
Battle of Cape Passaro 11 August – The British fleet under Admiral George Byng defeat the Spanish near Cape Passero, Sicily.
Battle of Cape Fear River 26–27 September - British defeat pirates
 Battle of the Salween River September – Zunghar forces defeat a Chinese expeditionary force sent to capture Lhasa.
Battle of Milazzo 15 October Spain defeats Holy Roman Empire.
Siege of Fredriksten 12 December – Swedish king is killed in Norway during the Great Northern War.
Carolean Death March December - Failed Swedish incursion into Norway.
 1719 
Capture of Eilean Donan Castle 10 May - Brits attack and destroy Jacobites in Eilean Donan
Capture of Pensacola May - Status quo ante bellum between Spain and France.
Battle of Ösel Island 4 June - Russian victory over Sweden.
Battle of Glen Shiel 10 June - Great Britain defeats Jacobite rebellion aided by Spain.
Battle of Francavilla 20 June - Spanish victory over Austria.
Attack on Marstrand 10–16 July - Danish capture of a fort that led to a Swedish scandal
Battle of Stäket 13 August - Swedes defeat Russians
Siege of San Sebastián 30 June - 19 August - France captures San Sebastián from Spain.
Capture of Vigo October - Brits capture Galician cities
Battle of Cape St. Vincent – 20 December Spain defeats Great Britain.
 1720 
 Battle of Nassau 24 February-1 March– Spanish forces assault the British settlement of Nassau during the War of the Quadruple Alliance.
 Villasur expedition 16 June-14 August - Pawnee and Otoe defeat Spanish incursions
 Battle of Grengam 7 August - Last major battle in Great Northern War. Naval Batle between Sweden and Russia. Both sides claimed victory.
 Chinese expedition to Tibet - Qing rule established in Tibet at the cost of the Dzungar Khanate.
 1721 
 Attingal Outbreak April–October - Massacre at, and siege of, Anchuthengu Fort
 Sack of Shamakhi 18 August - Casus belli of the Russo-Persian War 
 Battle of Fatehpur Sikri 26 September - Jat victory over Mughals
 Battle of Glen Affric – Government backed forces of the Clan Ross fight against rebel the forces of the Clan Mackenzie.
 Battle of Coille Bhan - Small skirmish between Jacobites and Government forces
 1722 
 Battle of Cape Lopez 10 February - British defeat pirates
 Battle of Gulnabad 8 March – The military forces from Hotaki dynasty fight the army of the Safavid Empire.
 Siege of Isfahan 8 March-23 October - Siege of Safavid-held Isfahan by the Hotaki Dynasty
 Battle of Winnepang July - New England forces attack Miꞌkmaq
 Peter the Great's capture of Rasht December - Russians hold Rasht for 10 years
 1723
 Capture of the schooner Fancy 10 June - British capture pirates
 1724
 Battle of Norridgewock 23 August - New England colonists massacre Abenaki
 Battle of Shakar Kheda 11 October - Independence of Hyderabad State
 1725 Battle of Pequawket 9 May - Death of Chief Paugus
 1726 Blockade of Porto Bello - Spanish evade British blockade
 1727 
 Thirteenth siege of Gibraltar 11 February-12 June - British victory
 Battle of Halidzor 26 February-7 March - Armenian victory
 Action of 11 March 1727 - Brits push away Spanish fleet
 Battle of Sangan July–October - Sadozai defeat against Safavids.
 1728 Battle of Palkhed 28 February – Maratha Peshwa Baji Rao I defeats Mughal Governor of Deccan, Nizam-ul-Mulk.
 1729 
 Battle of Bundelkhand March - Maratha-Bundelkhandi forces defeat Mughals.
 Herat Campaign of 1729 4 May-1 July - Nader Shah of Iran captures Herat.
 Battle of Kafer Qal'eh 4 May-1 July - Sadozai defeat against Safavids.
 Battle of Herat July - Persians capture Herat
 Battle of Damghan 29 September-5 October – Nader Shah defeats the Afghans.
 Battle of Khwar Pass October - Hotaki forces fail to ambush Safavid forces.
 Battle of Murche-Khort 12 November - Safavid forces capture Isfahan.
 Liberation of Isfahan 16 November - Tahmasp II restored to Persian throne
 Natchez revolt 29 November - Natchez people revolt against French and massacred French townspeople
 1730 
 Battle of Zarghan 15 January - The Afghan Hotak Dynasty is expelled from Persia.
 Patrona Halil Rebellion - ended Tulip period
 1731 
 Herat Campaign of 1731 - Last stand of the Sadozai Sultanate of Herat.
 Samba rebellion - Slave rebellion in modern-day Louisiana
 Ta-Chia-hsi revolt - Aboriginal Taiwanese rebellion against Qing rule
 Tahmasp's campaign of 1731 - failed attempt by Tahmasp II to conquer Armenia
 1732 
 Spanish conquest of Oran 15 June-2 July - Spain reconquers Oran
 Battle of Mandsaur 21 October - Marathas force the Jaipur State to surrender
 Nader's Mesopotamian Campaign 10 December - Status quo ante bellum
 1733 
 Battle of Samarra 19 July - failed attempt by Safavids at conquering Ottoman Iraq
 Siege of Kehl 14–28 October - French victory
 Battle of Kirkuk 24–26 October – Persian ruler Nader Shah's defeats the Ottoman army, killing general Topal Osman Pasha.
 Siege of Pizzighettone 11 November-9 December - Franco-Sardinian victory
 1733 slave insurrection on St. John 23 November - Rebellion suppressed
 1734
Siege of Danzig 22 February-30 June - Russians capture Gdańsk
Siege of Gaeta 8 April-6 August - Franco-Spanish victory
Siege of Trarbach 10 April-2 May - French victory
Siege of Capua April-30 November - Spanish victory
Battle of Bitonto 25 May Spain defeats Austria.
Battle of Colorno 25 May-5 June - Franco-Sardinian victory
Siege of Philippsburg late May-18 July - French victory
Battle of San Pietro 29 June - Franco-Sardinian Victory
Battle of Guastalla 19 September – Charles Emmanuel III of Sardinia defeats the Spanish.
 1735
 Battle of Yeghevārd 19 June - final major engagement of Sixth Ottoman–Persian War.
 Battle of Clausen 20 October - one of the final engagements in War of the Polish Succession
 1736 Siege of Perekop 17 June - massive blow to Crimean independence
 1737 
 Battle of Delhi 28 March – Between Maratha Empire and the Mughals.
 Siege of Kandahar April - End of the Hotak dynasty.
 Siege of Ochakov 2 July - Russian-Cossack victory
 Battle of Banja Luka 4 August - Ottoman-Bosnian victory
 Battle of Bhopal 24 December - Maratha victory
 1738 
 Battle of the Dindar River March/April - major Ethiopian defeat against Kingdom of Sennar
 Battle of Khyber Pass 26 November - Persians defeat Mughals
 1739 –
Battle of Vasai 17 February-16 May - Portuguese forces pull out of Vasai after losing a battle to the Maratha Empire.
Battle of Karnal 24 February - Nader Shah of Persia decisively defeats the Mughal Empire, capturing and sacking Delhi
Battle of Grocka 22–23 July – Ottoman Empire defeats Austria.
Capture of Belgrade July-18 September - Ottomans recapture Belgrade
 Battle of Stavuchany 28 August – Russians defeat Ottoman Empire.
 Stono Rebellion 9 September - Failed slave revolt in South Carolina
 Battle of Porto Bello 20 November - British capture Panamanian settlement from Spain.
 1740
 Action of 8 April 1740 - British victory over Spain.
 First Battle of Giria 26 April - Death of Sarfaraz Khan, Alivardi Khan succeeds him as Nawab of Bengal in a Bengali civil war.
 Siege of St. Augustine 13 June-20 July - Spanish hold St. Augustine against Great Britain.
 Siege of Fort Mose 26 June - Spanish and free black troops hold off British forces
 Attacks on Fuerteventura in 1740 13 October/24 November - Spanish fend off British attacks
 1741 –
 First Siege of Trichinopolly 16 January-26 March - Maratha army kicks out Carnatic Sultanate.
 Battle of Cartagena de Indias 13 March – 20 May – Spanish decisive victory. One of the biggest British naval defeats.
 Battle of Mollwitz 10 April – Prussia under Frederick the Great fights and beats the Austrians under FM Neipperg in Silesian War.
 Battle of Gangwana 11 June - Jaipuri and Moghal victory over Marwar.
 Invasion of Cuba 4/5 August-9 December - Spain holds Cuba from Brits
 Battle of Colachel 10 August – Hindu ruler of Travancore, Marathanda Raja defeats Dutch East India Company at Colachel, off the southern coast of India.
 Battle of Villmanstrand 23 August - Russian victory pver Sweden.
 Battle of Prague 25-26 November - France, Bavaria and Saxony capture Prague from Austria.
 Battle of St. Pölten 23 December - Austria defeats France and Bavaria.
 1742 
 Battle of Schärding 17 January - Austria defeats Bavaria.
 Battle of Chotusitz 17 May – Frederick the Great of Prussia beats the Austrians for a second time under Prince Charles Alexander of Lorraine.
 Battle of Sahay 24 May - French victory over Austria.
 Action of 14 June 1742 - British victory over Spain.
 Siege of Prague 27 June – 18 December - France successfully withdraw through the Austrian lines after a long siege, so Austria manages to retake Prague.
 Invasion of Georgia 5-25 July - Spanish attempt to invade British Georgia
 Battle of Bloody Marsh 7 July - British victory over Spain.
 Battle of Gully Hole Creek 18 July - British victory over Spain.
 First Battle of Katwa 17 September- Marathas are forced to leave Bengal Subah.
 1743 
Battle of Campo Santo 8 February - Indecisive as both Spanish-Neapolitans and Austro-Sardinians claimed victory
Battle of La Guaira 2 March - Spanish defend Venezuela from British
Second Siege of Trichinopoly March – 29 August - Maratha forces are pushed out by Nizam of Hyderabad.
Battle of Puerto Cabello 16 April - Spain defeats Great Britain.
Battle of Simbach 9 May - Austria defeats Bavaria, the Electoral Palatinate and the Landgraviate of Hesse-Kassel.
Fourth Dalecarlian rebellion 30 May - Last major rural uprising in Sweden
Battle of Dettingen 27 June – French defeat against Great Britain, Hanover and Austria during War of the Austrian Succession.
Siege of Mosul 13 September-20 October - Negotiated Persian withdrawal from the Ottoman Empire.
Battle of Casteldelfino 7-10 October - Sardinia defeats Spain.
 1744 –
 Moḥammad Taqi Khan Shirazi's Rebellion January–June - Shiraz and most of Fars province in Persia sacked
 Battle of Toulon (1744) 22 February – Draw between British and Franco-Spanish fleets
 Siege of Villafranca 14–27 April - Franco-Spanish victory over Sardinia and Great Britain
 Battle of Villafranca 20 April – France and Spain defeat Britain and Sardinia.
 Action of 8 May 1744 - French victory over Great Britain
 Raid on Canso 23 May - French take a town in British Nova Scotia
 First Siege of Annapolis Royal 1 July-6 October - French-M'ikmaq attempt to take British Nova Scotia
 Battle of Casteldelfino 18 July – French troops victorious against Sardinians at bayonet-point despite several orders to retreat.
 Battle of Velletri 12 August - Spanish-Neapolitan victory over Austria
Battle of Nuwakot 26 September – Gorkhali forces defeat Nuwakot.
Battle of Madonna dell'Olmo 30 September – Franco-Spanish victory over Sardinian forces, Prince of Conti wounded twice.
Battle of Belkot - early battle in Unification of Nepal. Gorkhalis defeat the Belkot Kingdom.
 1745 –
 Battle of Pfaffenhofen 15 April - Austrians defeats France, Bavaria and the Electoral Palatinate.
 Second Siege of Annapolis Royal 2–23 May - British defeat M'ikmaq and French troops a second time
 Battle of Fontenoy 11 May – French victory, during the War of the Austrian Succession, against a coalition made of Great Britain, Hanover, the Dutch Republic and Austria
 Siege of Louisbourg 11 May-28 June - British victory over France.
 Capture of Vigilant 18–20 May - British victory over France.
 Battle of Anguilla 21 May - British defend Anguilla from France
 Battle of Hohenfriedberg 4 June – Frederick the Great of Prussia beats an Austro-Saxon army under Prince Charles Alexander of Lorraine.
 Siege of Tournai 25 April - 19 June - France captures Tournai from Austria. Tournai was defended by Dutch troops.
 Naval battle off Tatamagouche 26 June - Britain defends against a French-M'ikmaq force
 Battle of Melle 9 July - French victory over Austria, Great Britain, Hanover and the Netherlands.
 Fall of Ghent 11 - 15 July - French occupy Ghent from Austria.
 Highbridge Skirmish 16 August - Jacobite victory over the British government.
 Battle of Kars (1745) 19 August – Last major engagement of the Ottoman–Persian War. Persia defeats the Ottoman Empire.
 Siege of Ostend 23 August - French victory over a British garison. Ostend was captured from Austria.
 First Siege of Ruthven Barracks 29 August - The British government holds barracks against the Jacobites
 Battle of Prestonpans 21 September – Jacobite Stuarts under Charles Edward Stuart (Bonnie Prince Charlie) defeat English.
 Battle of Bassignano 27 September - France, Spain and Genoa defeat Sardinia and Austria.
 Battle of Soor 30 September – Frederick the Great of Prussia defeats a superior Austro-Saxon force under Prince Charles Alexander of Lorraine.
 Battle of Joseau 11 October - France defeats Sardinia.
 Siege of Culloden House 15–16 October - British government victory over the Jacobites.
 First Siege of Carlisle 13–15 November - Jacobites capture Carlisle from the British government.
 Battle of Hennersdorf 23 November - Prussian victory over Saxony.
 Raid on Saratoga 28 November - French victory over Great Britain.
 Battle of Kesselsdorf 14 December – Prussians defeat Austro-Saxon force.
 Clifton Moor Skirmish 18 December - Scottish forces continue withdrawal to Scotland against the British government.
 Second Siege of Carlisle 21–30 December - British government victory the Jacobites.
 Battle of Inverurie 23 December - Jacobite and French victory over the British government.
 Second Battle of Katwa December - Marathas attack Bengal, but are forced to retreat further
 First Siege of Fort Augustus December - British government victory the Jacobites.
 1746 –
 Battle of Falkirk (1746) 17 January – Jacobites defeat English dragoons.
 Siege of Stirling Castle 18 January-1 February - British government victory over the Jacobites.
 Siege of Brussels 29 January – 22 February - French capture Brussels from Austria.
 Second Siege of Ruthven Barracks 10 - 11 February - Jacobite victory over the British government.
 Siege of Inverness 21 February - Jacobite and French victory over the British government.
 Second Siege of Fort Augustus 22 February-1 March - Jacobite victory over the British government.
 Atholl raids 14–17 March - Jacobites flank British forces by surprise
 Siege of Blair Castle 17 March-2 April - Jacobite forces withdraw. Victory of the British government.
 Skirmish of Keith 20 March - Jacobite and French victory over the British government.
 Battle of Dornoch 20–21 March - Jacobite victory over the British government.
 Siege of Fort William 20 March-3 April - British government victory over the Jacobites and France.
 Skirmish of Tongue 25–26 March - British government victory over the Jacobites, France and Spain.
 Battle of Littleferry 15 April - British government victory over the Jacobites.
 Battle of Culloden Moor (or Battle of Culloden) 16 April – Jacobites and France lose to British government forces.
 Skirmish of Loch nan Uamh 2 May - Jacobite and French ships withdraw. British government victory.
 Skirmish of Loch Ailort 9 May - Unknown results between the British government and the Jacobites.
 Skirmish of Arisaig 17 May - Unknown results between the British government and the Jacobites.
 Raids on Lochaber and Shiramore 22 May-31 August - British government victory, but Jacobite leader Charles Edward Stuart escapes to France
 Battle at Port-la-Joye 11 June - French-M'ikmaq victory over Great Britain.
 Battle of Piacenza 16 June – Austrian victory during War of the Austrian Succession, Montcalm present on French side.
 Action of 6 July 1746 - Inconclusive naval batle between great Britain and France.
 Battle on the Tidone 10 August - France defeats Austria.
 Battle of Rottofreddo 12 August – French army defeats small Austrian force during French retreat to Genoa.
 Siege of Fort Massachusetts 19–20 August - French victory over Great Britain.
 Battle of Madras 7–9 September - French defeat British in India
 Raid on Lorient 20 September - French victory over Great Britain.
 Battle of Rocoux 11 October – French victory over an allied Austrian, British, Hanoverian and Dutch army outside Liège
 Battle of Adyar 24 October - French forces defeat Carnatic Sultanate
 Siege of Antibes 5 December - French victory over Austria, Sardinia and Great Britain.
 First Austro-Sardinian Siege of Genoa 6 - 9 December - Austro-British-Sardinian victory over France.
 1747
 Battle of Grand Pré 10–11 February - French victory over Great Britain.
 Battle of Rajamahal 1–2 March - Jaipuri victory over Mewar, supporters of Madho Singh, Holkar, Bundi and Kota.
 Battle of Burdwan March - Bengals defeat Marathas
 Siege of Fort at Number 4 7–9 April - British victory over France.
 First Battle of Cape Finisterre 14 May - British victory over France.
 Battle of Lauffeld 2 July – French victory over British, Austrian, Dutch and Hanoverian armies
 Battle of Assietta 19 July – Sardinia defeats a French army.
 Voyage of the Glorioso 25 July-14 October - Four naval engagements between Spain and Great Britain involving the Glorioso
 Siege of Bergen op Zoom (1747) 12 July - 16 September – French defeat the United Provinces supported by Great Britain.
 Raid on Matina 13 August - Great Britain defeats Spain.
 Second Battle of Cape Finisterre 14 October - British defeat French again
 Second Austro-Sardinian Siege of Genoa - Austrians try to recapture Genoa and fail
 1748 –
 Action of 31 January 1748 - British victory over France
 Battle of Manupur (1748) 11 March - Durrani defeat against Mughals.
 Action of 18 March 1748 - Brits capture Spanish vessels
 Battle of Saint-Louis-du-Sud 22 March - British victory over France
 Battle of Santiago de Cuba 9 April - Spanish victory over Great Britain
 Siege of Maastricht (1748) 15 April-7 May – Final few months of the campaign in the Low Countries. France captures Maastricht from the Netherlands.
 Siege of Cuddalore 17 June - British victory over France
 Battle of Bagru 20–26 August - Jaipuri-Bharatpuri victory over supporters of Madho Singh
 Siege of Pondicherry August–October - French defeat British
 Raid on Brunswick Town 5 September - British victory over Spain
 Battle of Havana 12 October – British minor naval victory during War of the Austrian Succession against Spain
 1749 
 1749 Muslim slave revolt in Malta 29 June - failed slave revolt by Maltese Muslims
 Battle of Ambur 3 August - first major battle in Second Carnatic War.
 First Raid on Dartmouth 30 September - M'ikmaqs and Acadians defeat British colonists
 Battle of Penfui 8 November - Beginning of decline in Portuguese influence in Timor
 Siege of Grand Pré 27 November-4 December - Brits defeat various Indigenous tribes
1750 
Battle at St. Croix 20–23 March - Brits defeat M'ikmaq and Acadian militia
Battle at Chignecto 3 September - Brit's defeat M'ikmaq militia
Battle of Kathio – Chippewas defeat Sioux and gain control of Minnesota.

Late 18th century (1751–1800)
 1751 
 Second Raid on Dartmouth 13 May - Acadian-M'ikmaq victory
 Battle of Kirkhbulakh 28 July - Kakheti victory over army of Azad Khan.
 Third Siege of Trichinopoly July-10 April - Carnatic defeat against British forces.
 Action of 28 November 1751 - Spanish defeat Algerian pirates
 Battle of Arnee 3 December - British-Maratha forces defeat French-carnatic ones
 1752 
 Battle of Lahore 6 March-3 April - Durrani victory against Mughals.
 Battle of Chingleput March - British-Arcot victory
 Naval Battle of Calicut 11 December - Portuguese victory
 1753 
 Attack at Mocodome 21 February - Ended ratification of Treaty of 1752
 Capture of Delhi 10 March - Old Delhi plundered.
 Battle of Seringham 12 April-8 June - British caught off guard near Srirangam
 Attack at Jeddore 19 May - M'ikmaq attack and massacre residents of Jeddore, Nova Scotia
 Battle of Golden Rock 26 June - Battle between British and French forces near Trichinopoli.
 1754 –
 Battle of Kumher 20 January-18 May - Jats defeat Marathas and negotiate peace
 Battle of Jumonville Glen 28 May – British victory
 Battle of Fort Necessity 3 July – French take the fort
 1755 –
 Braddock Expedition May–July - French-Indian victory
 Battle of Fort Beauséjour 3–16 June – British capture fort
 Action of 8 June 1755 - British victory
 Battle of the Monongahela Valley 9 July – Key battle in Braddock Expedition, Britain fails to capture Fort Duquesne
 Battle of Petitcodiac 4 September - French-Acadian-M'ikmaq victory
 Battle of Lake George 8 September - British-Iroquois victory
 Battle of Čevo November – 3 December – Ahmad Pasha with 20 000 Ottoman soldiers has been repulsed from Montenegro by 5000 Montenegrin fighters after initial success and conquering Čevo. 
 Battle of Taliwa - Cherokee defeat Muscogee Confederacy 
 1756 –
 Guaraní War February - Sepé Tiaraju leads a rebellion against Jesuit Spanish and Portuguese authorities.
 Battle of Fort Bull 27 March – French capture British fort
 Battle of the Trough March–April - Shawnee and Lenape forces defeat British
 Battle of Sideling Hill 4 April - Lenape victory
 Battle of Great Cacapon 18 April - British troops ambushed by Shawnee and Delaware, deemed Mercer's Massacre
 Siege of Fort St Philip April-29 June - French victory
 Raid on Lunenburg, Nova Scotia 8 May - French and local troops push back a British incursion
 Battle of Minorca (1756) 20 May – The French fleet gains a strategic victory
 Battle of Fort Oswego (1756) 10 August – French and Indian allies take and raze the only British trading post on Lake Ontario, thus re-establishing French sovereignty.
 Kittanning Expedition 8 September - British expedition to retrieve prisoners of war ends in them massacreing local Lenape
 Siege of Pirna 10 September-14 October - Prussian victory
 Battle of Lobositz 1 October – Opening battle of the Seven Years' War
 Siege of Calcutta - Siraj ud-Daulah captures Kolkata from British.
 1757 –
 Battle of Narela 16 January - Maratha Empire defeats Durranis.
 First Battle on Snowshoes 21 January - Stalemate, will be continued the next year
 Battle of Bobbili 24 January - Princely Estate of Vizianagaram inducts Bobbili
 Battle of Chandannagar 23 March - British defeat French in India
 Battle of Reichenberg 21 April – Prussian victory over Austria in the Seven Years' War
 Siege of Fort William Henry 4–9 August – British defeated by French then Indians slaughter prisoners.
 Battle of Prague 6 May – Prussians beat the Austrians, though at a terrible cost during the Seven Years' War.
 Battle of Kolín 18 June – Frederick the Great of Prussia loses, for the first time, to Austria in Seven Years' War.
 Battle of Plassey 23 June – Robert Clive consolidates English rule over India.
 Invasion of Hanover June–September - French capture Hanover, but then are forced to leave
 Battle of Sabbath Day Point 23 July - French/Indian victory
 Battle of Hastenbeck 26 July – French army defeats Hanover, Great Britain, Hesse-Kassel and Brunswick.
 Mysore's campaigns against the states of Malabar July - Mysore takes the Malabar Coast
 Battle of Delhi 11 August - Durranis capture Delhi from Mughal Empire
 Battle of Gross-Jägersdorf 30 August – Russians under Stepan Fedorovich Apraksin defeat the Prussians.
 Battle of Moys 7 September – Prussian-Austrian battle during the Seven Years' War
 Raid on Berlin 16 October - Prussians pay 250000 thalers to the Holy Roman Empire
 Battle of Cap-Français 21 October - Indecisive
 Battle of Rossbach 5 November – Frederick crushes French, Louis XV says "After me, the Deluge".
 Battle of Amritsar 11 November - Durrani loss against the Shaheedan Misl.
 Attack on German Flatts 12 November - French-Indian-Acadian victory
 First Battle of Breslau 22 November – Battle fought during the Seven Years' War, Austrians briefly re-conquer Silesia.
 Battle of Leuthen 5 December – Frederick the Great crushes Austrians under Prince Charles Alexander of Lorraine; considered Frederick's greatest victory.
 Second Battle of Breslau 7–20 December - Prussian victory
 Battle of Bloody Creek 10 December - French-M'ikmaq victory
 Battle of Khresili 14 December - Georgian kingdoms defeat Ottomans
 Blockade of Stralsund December - Prussians blockade Stralsund from Swedes
 Maratha conquest of North-west India - Marathas capture Punjab and Peshawar
 1758 –
 Battle of Cartagena 28 February
 Second Battle on Snowshoes 13 March - French victory
 Battle of Cuddalore 29 April – Indecisive naval battle of Seven Years' War
 Action of 29 April 1758 - British victory
 British capture of Senegal April–May - Brits capture Senegal from France
 Raid on St Malo 5–12 June - British victory
 Battle of Louisbourg 8 June – 26 July – also Louisburg, British capture fort controlling entrance to St. Lawrence River.
 Battle of Cape Palos 9–10 June - Spanish defeat Algerian pirates
 Battle of Rheinberg 12 June - Indecisive
 Battle of Krefeld 23 June – Ferdinand son of duke of Brunswick drives French across the Rhine.
 Battle of Domstadtl 30 June – Seven Years' War: Ernst Gideon von Laudon and Joseph von Siskovits routed a convoy with supplies for the Prussians besieging Olomouc, protected by forces of Hans Joachim von Zieten.
 Petitcodiac River campaign June–November - British victory
 Battle of Bernetz Brook 6 July – A sharp engagement in the Carillon campaign between the British and an isolated party of Frenchmen
 Battle of Carillon 6–8 July – Also called Battle of Ticonderoga. A far superior British force badly mauled after foolishly attacking entrenched French head on.
 Battle of Negapatam 3 August – Britain and France fight indecisive naval battle off the coast of India.
 Raid on Cherbourg 7–16 August - British victory
 Battle of Zorndorf 25 August – Frederick battles Russians under Fermor in Prussia to a bloody draw.
 Battle of Fort Frontenac 26–28 August - British victory
 Battle of Saint Cast 11 September - French victory
 Battle of Fort Duquesne 14 September – French repel British attack, but realize they can't hold fort.  Fort abandoned by French in November.
 Battle of Tornow 26 September - Prussian victory
 Battle of Fehrbellin 28 September - Swedish victory
 Cape Sable campaign September–October - British victory
 First Battle of Lutterberg 10 October - French victory
 Battle of Fort Ligonier 12 October – French attack on fort fails
 Battle of Hochkirch 14 October – Austrians mildly defeat Prussians
 Battle of Condore 9 December - British victory
 Capture of Gorée December - British take Gorée, the slave trading post, from France
 Siege of Madras December - 2-month siege leading to British victory
 Battle of Peshawar - Durrani loss by the Maratha Empire.
 1759 –
 Invasion of Guadeloupe 22 January-1 May - Guadeloupe occupied by the British for 4 years
 Battle of Río Bueno 27 January - Spanish victory over Mapuche
 Siege of Masulipatam 6 March-7 April - British victory
 Battle of Bergen (1759) 13 April – French repulse Ferdinand's drive on Frankfurt-am-Main
 Battle of Peterswalde 14 April-20 April - Austrian column destroyed
 Raid on Le Havre 3–5 July - British victory
 Battle of Fort Niagara 6–26 July – British take fort, but Brigadier General John Prideaux is killed.
 Battle of Kay 23 July - Russia defeats Prussians
 Battle of La Belle-Famille 24 July - British-Iroquois victory
 Battle of Ticonderoga (1759) 26–27 July – British capture French fort
 Battle of Beauport 31 July – French stop British attempt to land near Quebec city; notable naval bombardment with British ships and batteries firing 4000 rounds in 8 hours on French shoreline entrenchments.
 Battle of Minden 1 August – Ferdinand defeats French.
 Battle of Kunersdorf 12 August - Russo-Austrian victory
 Battle of Lagos 18–19 August – British naval victory near Portugal
 Battle of Pondicherry 10 September – Indecisive naval battle near India
 Battle of Frisches Haff 10 September - Swedish victory
 Battle of the Plains of Abraham 13 September – English defeat French outside Quebec City.
 Battle of Hoyerswerda 25 September - Prussians defeat Austrians
 Gulf of St. Lawrence campaign - September - British victory
 St. Francis Raid 4 October - British victory
 Ile Saint-Jean campaign October–November - British victory
 Battle of Chinsurah 1 November - British victory
 Battle of Güstow 18 November - Prussian victory
 Battle of Quiberon Bay 20 November
 Battle of Maxen 21 November – Battle during the Seven Years' War
 Battle of Meissen 4 December – Battle during the Seven Years' War
 Battle of Lahore August - Maratha victory against Durrani Empire.
 Battle of Kakkor - Rajput victory
 1760 –
 Battle of Udgir 3 January - Marathas defeat Mughals
 Battle of Wandiwash 22 January - British defeat French-Maratha forces
 Battle of Carrickfergus 21–26 February - French defeat Irish forces
 Siege of Fort Loudoun February-9 August - Cherokee defeat British
 Battle of Bishops Court 28 February - British victory
 Battle of Neustadt 25 March - Prussian victory
 Tacky's War 7 April-1761 - Slave uprising in Jamaica
 Battle of Sainte-Foy 28 April – French defeat British but fail to re-take Quebec city; entrenched French forced to retreat when British naval re-enforcements arrive in May.
 Battle of Pointe-aux-Trembles 16 May - British victory
 Siege of Glatz 7 June-26 July - Austrian victory
 Sainte-Thérèse Raid 11–21 June - British defeat French at Lake Champlain
 Battle of Landeshut 23 June – In Bavaria, Austria captures a Prussian army
 Battle of Echoee 27 June - Cherokee defeat British
 Battle of Restigouche 28 June-8 July - British victory
 Battle of Corbach 10 July - French defeat British allied with German kingdoms
 Siege of Dresden 13–22 July - Austro-Saxon victory
 Battle of Emsdorf 16 July - Anglo-Hanoverian victory
 Battle of Warburg 31 July - British-HRE victory
 Battle of Warburg 1 August – Battle during the Seven Years' War
 Battle of Liegnitz 15 August – Frederick defeats Austrians
 Battle of the Thousand Islands 16–24 August
 Battle of Strehla 20 August - Prussian victory
 Siege of Pondicherry 4 September - British victory
 Battle of Pasewalk 3 October - Swedish victory
 Raid on Berlin 3–12 October - Berlin occupied by Russo-Austrian forces
 Battle of Kloster Kampen 15 October - French victory
 Battle of the Windward Passage 17–19 October - British defeat French
 Battle of Torgau 3 November – Prussian pyrrhic victory over Austria during the Seven Years' War
 1761 –
 Third Battle of Panipat 14 January – Afghans defeat The Marathas.
 Battle of Langensalza 15 February - Prussian-Hanoverian victory
 Battle of Grünberg 21 March - Ended Siege of Cassel below
 First Siege of Cassel March - Failed siege by Duke Ferdinand of Brunswick-Wolfenbüttel
 Capture of Belle Île 7 April-8 June - British capture Belle Île
 Capture of Agra 3 May-12 June - Bharatpur State bribes the Mughals into occupying Agra
 Invasion of Dominica June - British capture Dominica
 Action of 17 July 1761 14–17 July - British victory
 Battle of Villinghausen 15–16 July – Large French force defeated during Seven Years' War
 Battle of Cape Finisterre 13–14 August - British victory
 First Battle of Sialkot August - Sikhs defeat Mughals
 Battle of Neuensund 18 September - Swedes defeat Prussians
 Battle of Gujranwala September - Sikh victory
 Battle of Ölper 13 October - Duchy of Brunswick victory
 Siege of Lahore 27 October - Sikhs besiege Lahore
 1762 –
Battle of Neukalen 2 January - Swedish victory
Invasion of Martinique 5 January-12 February - British hold Martinique
Battle of Kup 5 February - Afghans defeat Sikhs
Spanish invasion of Portugal 5 May-24 November - Anglo-Portuguese victory, Spanish obliterated
Action of 31 May 1762 - British defeat Spain
Battle of Harnaulgarh May - Durranis kicked out of Sirhind-Fategarh
Siege of Havana 6 June-13 August - Havana occupied by British for a year and a half
Battle of Wilhelmsthal 24 June - Allied victory
Second Battle of Lutterberg 19 July - Allied victory
Battle of Burkersdorf 21 July – Battle during the Seven Years' War
Battle for the Río San Juan de Nicaragua 26 July-3 August - 100 Spanish soldiers defeat 2000 British soldiers
Siege of Schweidnitz 7 August-9 October - Prussian victory
First Battle of Makwanpur 21 August - Gorkhali soldiers defeat the Kingdom of Makwanpur
Siege of Almeida 25 August - Spanish victory over Portugal
Battle of Valencia de Alcántara 27 August
Battle of Nauheim 30 August - French victory
First Cevallos expedition 3 September - Spanish victory
Battle of Signal Hill 15 September - British victory, last battle of French and Indian War
Battle of Manila 24 September – 6 October – British capture Philippines from Spanish.
Battle of Vila Velha 5 October - Anglo-Portuguese victory
Battle of Freiberg 29 October - Prussian victory
Action of 30 October 1762 - Brits defeat Spain
Second Siege of Cassel October–November - Allies occupy Kassel
Battle of Marvão 9–10 November
Battle of Alegaon - Nizam of Hyderabad defeats Marathas.
 1763 
Second Battle of Makwanpur 20 January - Gorkhali soldiers defeat Nawabs of Bengal and Murshidabad
Berbice slave uprising 23 February - Rebellion suppressed
Siege of Fort Detroit 9 May-31 October - British victory
Battle of Point Pelee 28 May
Siege of Fort Pitt 22 June-10 August - British victory in Pontiac's War
Third Battle of Katwa 19 July - English victory over Nawabs of Bengal and Murshidabad
Battle of Bloody Run 31 July
Battle of Bushy Run 4–5 August – British defeat Indians in Pennsylvania backcountry.
Battle of Rakshasbhuvan 10 August - Marathas defeat Nizam of Hyderabad
Battle of Devil's Hole 14 September - Seneca victory
Battle of Thrissur - Travancori victory
 1764 
 Battle of Sirhind 26 February - Sikhs capture Sirhind-Fategarh
 Battle of Buxar 22–23 October – Mughal emperor with his combined forces attacks British to drive British out of Bengal, British successful.
 Battle of Delhi October–February - Bharatpuri victory against Mughals
 Battle of Atakpamé - Akan forces severely defeat Ashanti Empire
 1765 
 Strilekrigen 18 April - Norwegian farmers rebel but are defeated
 Larache expedition 25–28 June - French troops fail to invade Morocco
 1766
 Esquilache Riots 23–26 March - Massives riots sparked by increases in bread, oil, and coal prices.
 Monghyr Mutiny 1 May-12 June - Europeans stationed in Bengal stage a mutiny against Robert Clive
 Mapuche uprising of 1766 - 25 December - Spanish pushed out of Araucanía Region
 1767 
 Battle of Tiruvannamalai 25 September - Decisive British victory
 Battle of Sindhuli 6 November - Gorkhalis defeat Brits
 Siege of Ambur 10 November-7 December - British defend town
 Battle of Maonda and Mandholi 14 December - Rajput victory
 Battle of Goteik Gorge Late December - Burmese army forced to resort to guerrilla warfare
 Battle of Kirtipur - Gorkhalis defeat Kingdom of Lalitpur
 Battle of Bang Rajan 
 1768 –
 Battle of Kama 29 February - Rajput victory
 Battle of Maymyo March – Burmese army under Maha Thiha Thura destroys the Qing Bannerman army at modern-day Pyinoolwin
 Battle of Ooscota 22–23 August - Hyderabad notices a British attempt to aid the Maratha Empire
 Battle of Borgo 8 October - Corsicans defeat first battle in French incursion
 Battle of Kathmandu - Beginning of Shah dynasty
 Battle of Lalitpur - Gorkhalis fully defeat Kingdom of Lalitpur
 Louisiana Rebellion of 1768 - Spanish defeat a Creole rebellion
 1769 
 Battle of Ponte Novu 8–9 May - battle that let France annex Corsica
 Siege of Tanjore 22 September-22 October - Rajah of Tanjore surrenders to Carnatic-British forces
 Moamoria rebellion 25 November - 35-year rebellion that killed half the population of Ahom kingdom and brought the end of the Paik system
 Battle of Faggeta 9 December – Ras Mikael Sehul and Emperor Tekle Haymanot, with the help of Goshu of Amhara and Wand Bewossen, defeat Fasil of Damot.
 Battle of Bhaktapur - Gorkha Kingdom takes entire Kathmandu Valley
 1770 –
 Battle of Golden Hill 19 January – In New York, the first bloodshed between the rebels and their colonial masters
 Battle of Błonie 12 February - Russian victory over Poles
 Battle of Nauplia 27–28 May - Indecisive battle between Russians and Turks
 Capture of Port Egmont 10 June - Spain seizes Port Egmont on the British-owned Falkland Islands.
 Battle of Chesme 6 July – Russian fleet defeats Ottoman fleet.
 Battle of Larga 7 July – Russian army defeats Crimean Tatars and Ottoman janissaries.
 Battle of Kagul 21 July – Russian army under Rumyantsev attacks and puts to flight 150,000 Turks.
 Battle of Kagul 1 August - Russian victory
 Battle of Aspindza - Kartli-Kakheti victory over the Ottomans.
 First invasion of Mani - Ottomans begin their attempts to annex Mani, all of which fail
 Battle of Vromopigada - Maniots defeat an Ottoman incursion
 1771 –
 Battle at the Yadkin River 9 May - Regulator victory
 Battle of Alamance 16 May – Colonial government crushes North Carolina patriots (Regulators).
 Battle of Lanckorona 22 February-23 May – A force of 4,000 Russians under Alexander Suvorov defeat a Polish formation of 1,300 men.
 Three battles of Sarbakusa May – An alliance of three of the most powerful aristocrats of Ethiopia – Goshu of Amhara, Wand Bewossen, and Fasil of Damot – defeats Ras Mikael Sehul and Emperor Tekle Haymanot I, taking control of that country.
 Battle of Lake Huleh 2 September - Al-Zayadina victory in a rebellion
Battle of Stołowicze 23 September
Capture of Delhi - Marathas kick out Afghans from Delhi.
 1772
 First Russian bombardment of Beirut 18–23 June - Russians occupy Beirut till the 28th.
 Capture of Fort Boekoe 20 September - Dutch forces under Jurriaan de Friderici capture and destroy Fort Boekoe defended by Maroon leader Boni in Suriname.
 Battle of Patras 6–8 November - Russians defeat Ottomans
 1773
 Action of 4 July 1773 - Indecisive results
 Second Russian bombardment of Beirut 2 August-10 October - Russians occupy Beirut till early February 1774
 Action of 3 September 1773 - Russians attack Ottomans who don't fight back
 Siege of Orenburg[ru] 16 October - Russians besieged by peasants successfully defend their fortress
 1774 
 Siege of Yaits Fortress [ru] 10 January-27 April - Russians successfully defend from peasants
 Battle of Tatishcheva [ru] 2 April - Russians defeat rebels
 Battle of Miranpur Katra 23 April - British-Awadh victory
 Battle of Kozludzha 20 June - Russian victory
 Battle of Kerch Strait 20 June - Ottomans attack Russians and then retreat
 Battle of Kazan 12–15 July - Rebel Tatars and Cossacks sack Kazan
 Battle of Tsaritsyn 21 August - Russians defeat peasants
 Battle of Point Pleasant 10 October – Frontiersmen defeat Shawnees.
 Siege of Melilla 9 December - Spain holds Melilla
 1775 –
Battle of Pachgaon 26 January - Mudhoji Bhonsle ascends to the throne of Nagpur.
Battle of Lexington and Concord 19 April – Patriot militia repel British in confrontation at Concord, drive them back to Boston.
Thompson's War 9–15 May - Prompted the Burning of Falmouth later in October
 Capture of Fort Ticonderoga 10 May – Ethan Allen and Benedict Arnold capture fort.
 Battle off Fairhaven 14 May - Patriots storm British ship
 Battle of Chelsea Creek 27–28 May - Patriots defeat Brits in the second battle of the American Revolutionary War
 Battle of Machias 11–12 June – First naval engagement of American Revolution; British sloop captured.
 Battle of Bunker Hill 17 June – British win, Patriot morale boost
 Battle of Mandan June - Shekhawat chiefs defeat Mughals
 Invasion of Algiers 8 July - Ottoman Algeria defeats Spanish-Tuscan forces
 Battle of Gloucester 8–9 August - British commander defeats Patriot forces
 Siege of Fort St. Jean 21 August – 3 November – Americans under Richard Montgomery capture fort near Montreal.
 Raid on St. John 27 August - American privateers defeat British 
 Rising of the Priests 8 September - Maltese people revolt against the corrupt government and Knights Hospitaller
 Battle of Longue Pointe 25 September – American attack on Montreal led by Ethan Allen fails; Allen is captured.
 Burning of Falmouth 18 October - British burn Falmouth, Massachusetts
 Battle of Kemp's Landing 15 November - British victory
 Raid on Charlottetown 17–18 November - American pirates defeat Brits
 Siege of Savage's Old Fields 19–21 November - Inconclusive
 Raid on Yarmouth, Nova Scotia 5 December - Americans defeat British militia
 Battle of Great Bridge 9 December – American victory seals the fate of the British colonial government in Virginia.
Battle of Great Cane Break 22 December
Battle of Quebec 31 December – Arnold and Richard Montgomery defeated before Quebec City; Montgomery killed.
 1776 –
Battle of Moore's Creek Bridge 27 February – NC patriots defeat Scottish Loyalists.
 Battle of the Rice Boats 2–3 March – British ships set on fire.
 Raid of Nassau 3–4 March - American-backed Bahamians defeat British
 Battle of Saint-Pierre 25 March - Canadian-American forces defeat British
 Battle of Block Island 8 April - British victory
 Battle of The Cedars 15–16 May – British capture American forces near Montreal during American Revolutionary War.
 Battle of Trois-Rivières 8 June – American counterattack during retreat from Quebec fails.
 Battle of Sullivan's Island 28 June - South Carolina defeats British
 Battle of Turtle Gut Inlet 29 June – American naval battle with British.
 First Battle of Terrenate 7 July - Spanish Pyrrhic victory
 Battle of Gwynn's Island 8–10 July - American victory
 Battle of Lindley's Fort 15 July - South Carolinian victory
 Battle of Long Island 27 August – William Howe crushes George Washington.
 Landing at Kip's Bay 15 September - British victory
 Battle of Harlem Heights 16 September – Washington repels Howe.
 Raid on Canso 22 September-22 November - American victory
 Battle of Valcour Island 11 October – Benedict Arnold escapes the British fleet under Guy Carleton.
 Rutherford Light Horse expedition 17 October-16 November - American massacre of Appalachian Native groups for supporting British
 Battle of Pell's Point 18 October – British forces defeat Colonel John Glover's forces.
Battle of Mamaroneck 22 October
Battle of White Plains 28 October – Howe inflicts casualties on George Washington's army.
Battle of Fort Cumberland 10–29 November - British victory
Ambush of Geary 14 December - American victory
Battle of Maonda and Mandholi 14 December - Massive battle between Jaipur and Bharatpur marking the beginning of the Rajput invasion of Bharatpur
Battle of Iron Works Hill 22–23 December - Precursor to George Washington's crossing of the Delaware River
Battle of Trenton 26 December – Washington surprises Hessian force.
Battle of Fort Cumberland 22 November – 28 December – American attack on fort in Nova Scotia fails.
 1777 –
Battle of the Assunpink Creek 2 January – Also known as the Second Battle of Trenton. After repulsing the British during the day, Washington marches by night to Princeton.
 Battle of Princeton 3 January – Washington defeats the British force.
 Battle of Millstone 20 January - American victory with few casualties
 Forage War January–March - short campaign in New Jersey
 Battle of Punk Hill 8 March - Philadelphian-American victory
 Battle off Yarmouth 28 March - British victory
 Battle of Bound Brook 13 April – Successful British attack during American Revolution.
Battle of Ridgefield 27 April
Battle of Thomas Creek 17 May
Meigs Raid 24 May - American victory
Battle of Short Hills 26 June
Siege of Fort Ticonderoga 2–6 July – Americans abandon fort to avoid British artillery.
Battle of Hubbardton 7 July - Pyrrhic victory for the British
Battle of Fort Anne 8 July - British victory
Capture of USS Hancock 8–9 July - British capture American ship
Battle of Oriskany 6 August – General Herkimer killed in British ambush.
Battle of Machias 13–14 August - American-Native alliance versus Britain ends in stalemate
Battle of Bennington 16 August – John Stark eradicates detachment sent by Burgoyne.
Battle of Staten Island 22 August - Skirmish that did not affect the war much
Battle of Setauket 22 August - Failed attempt to recreate Meigs Raid
Battle of Cooch's Bridge 3 September - One of the first battles involving Hessians 
Battle of Brandywine 11 September – Howe drives George Washington's troops to Philadelphia.
Battle of the Clouds 16 September - British victory
Battle of 1st Saratoga 19 September – Freeman's Farm, Morgan defeats Burgoyne.
Battle of Paoli 20 September - British victory
Battle of Germantown 4 October – Howe kills 700 patriots while losing 534.
Battle of Forts Clinton and Montgomery 6 October - British victory
Battle of 2nd Saratoga 7 October – Gates (Benedict Arnold) defeats Burgoyne.
Battle of Red Bank 22 October - American victory
Battle of Gloucester 25 November - American victory
Battle of White Marsh 5–8 December - Inconclusive
Battle of Matson's Ford 11 December - British victory
Battle of Stillwater
Battle of Saunshi - Kingdom of Mysore defeats Marathas.
 1778 –
Battle off Barbados 7 March - British victory
Battle of Quinton's Bridge 18 March
Frederica naval action 19 April - American victory
Battle off Liverpool, Nova Scotia 24 April - British defeat French raid
North Channel Naval Duel 24 April - John Paul Jones, while outnumbered, defeats British fleet
Battle of Crooked Billet 1 May – American contingent forced to abandon their supplies.
Battle of Barren Hill 20 May
Mount Hope Bay raids 25–30 May - British successfully raid American settlements
Battle of Cobleskill 30 May - British victory
Battle of Wyoming 3 July - British-Iroquois victory
Action of 17 June 1778 - Minor British victory
Battle of Monmouth 28 June – George Washington stands off Clinton, Clinton continues retreat to NY, Charles Lee order of retreat leads to court-martial.
Battle of Alligator Bridge 30 June – American attack thwarted because of terrain, including ditch dug by British.
First Battle of Ushant 27 July – Indecisive naval battle
Battle of Rhode Island 29 August - First mixed-race regiment in American history
Grey's raid 5–12 September - British sack New Bedford, Massachusetts
Invasion of Dominica 7 September - French recapture Dominica
Attack on German Flatts 17 September - British raid American troop ground
Battle of Edgar's Lane 30 September - Continental victory
Raid on Unadilla and Onaquaga 2–16 October - Americans attack Iroquois villages
Battle of Chestnut Neck 6 October
Affair at Little Egg Harbor 15 October - British victory
Action of 20 October 1778 - Indecisive
Carleton's Raid 24 October-14 November - British victory
Battle of St. Lucia 15 December – British naval victory
Capture of St. Lucia 18–28 December - British victory
Capture of Savannah 29 December - Loyalists capture Savannah, Georgia
 1779 –
Battle of Wadgaon 12–13 January - East India Company retreats to Bombay.
Battle of Beaufort 3 February
Battle of Van Creek 11 February
Battle of Kettle Creek 14 February – Pickens defeats loyalist brigade.
Battle of Kealakekua Bay 14 February - End of James Cook
Battle of Vincennes 23–25 February – Americans capture fort.
Battle of Brier Creek 3 March – Ashe loses 350 men near Augusta to British.
Invasion of Jersey 1 May - Brits repel a French invasion
Chesapeake raid 10–24 May - British naval forces attempt to raid Chesapeake Bay
Action of 13 May 1779 - British victory
Battle of Chillicothe May - Destruction of Chillicothe, Ohio
Capture of Saint Vincent 16–18 June - French victory
Battle of Stono Ferry 20 June
Great Siege of Gibraltar 24 June - 4-year siege, Brits hold out
Battle of Khatu Shyamji June - Rajput victory
Capture of Grenada 2–4 July - French victory
Tryon's raid 3-mid July - Eventual failure, just a few towns burned
Battle of Grenada 6 July – French naval victory
Battle of Norwalk 12 July - Destruction of all but 6 houses in Norwalk, Connecticut
Battle of Stony Point 16 July – Wayne takes 700 prisoners in bayonet attack with only 15 patriot casualties.
Battle of Minisink 19–22 July - British loyalist, imperial, and Iroquois victory
Penobscot Expedition 24 July-16 August - British victory
Battle of Paulus Hook 19 August – Henry Lee drives British from New Jersey.
Battle of Newtown 29 August – Americans defeat Iroquois.
Battle of Fort Bute 7 September – Spanish victory over British forces
Battle of Lake Pontchartrain 10 September – Americans led by William Pickles capture West Florida.
Action of 11 September 1779 - French victory
Boyd and Parker ambush 13 September - British victory
Action of 14 September 1779 - British victory off the Azores
Capture of Cayo Cocina 15 September - Spanish capture St. George's Caye
Siege of Savannah 16 September-18 October – American siege fails.
Battle of Baton Rouge (1779) 20–21 September – Spanish capture city.
Capture of Fort New Richmond 21 September - Spanish capture the area
Battle of Flamborough Head 23 September - Pyrrhic Frano-American victory
Second Battle of Ushant 6 October - French defeat British
Battle of San Fernando de Omoa 16 October-29 November - Spain withdraws from fortress
Action of 11 November 1779 - British victory off Lisbon
Action of 20 November 1779 - Another British victory off Lisbon
First Battle of Tucson 9 December – Spanish victory over Apache warriors
Action of 12 December 1779 - British victory off Honduras
Battle of Martinique 18 December - British capture Martinique
Battle of Guadeloupe 21–22 December - British take Guadeloupe
Battle of Rohtas December - Durrani victory against various Sikh misls.
Capture of Río Hondo - Spanish attack British settlements and fail, then the British abandon settlements
Sullivan Expedition - American attempt to genocide Iroquois
 1780 –
Action of 8 January 1780 - British victory off Venezuela
Battle of Cape St. Vincent (1780) 16 January – British fleet under Admiral Sir George Rodney destroys a smaller Spanish fleet under Don Juan de Lángara.
Raid on Elizabethtown and Newark 25 January - British victory, but unimportant in the course of the war
Battle of Young's House 3 February - British victory
Action of 24 February 1780 - British victory
 Battle of Fort Charlotte 2–14 March – Spanish victory near Mobile, Alabama
 San Juan Expedition 17 March-8 November - Spanish victory
 Siege of Charleston 29 March-12 May - Charleston, South Carolina surrenders to the British
 Battle of Monck's Corner 14 April - British victory
 Battle of Martinique 17 April – Indecisive naval battle between British and French
 Battle of Lenud's Ferry 6 May - British victory
 Siege of Charleston 12 May – British take South Carolina city.
 Bird's invasion of Kentucky 25 May-4 August - British and Shawnee capture Kentucky
 Battle of Saint Louis 26 May – British unable to take town from Spanish.
 Battle of Waxhaws 29 May - British victory
 Action of 7 June 1780 - Inconclusive
 Battle of Connecticut Farms 7 June - One of the last battles in the Northern US during the American Revolutionary War
 Battle of Mobley's Meeting House 8 June - Patriot victory
 Action of 15 June 1780 - British victory
 Battle of Ramsour's Mill 20 June - Patriot victory
 Battle of Springfield 23 June – Greene defeats British.
 First Battle off Halifax 10 July - American victory
 Huck's Defeat 12 July - Patriot victory, defeat of Christian Huck
 Battle of Bull's Ferry 20–21 July - British victory
 Battle of Colson's Mill 21 July - Patriot victory
 Battle of Rocky Mount 31 July-1 August - Loyalist victory
Battle of Hanging Rock 6 August
Battle of Piqua 8 August - Pyrrhic victory for the Americans
Action of 9 August 1780 - Franco-Spanish victory
Third Battle of Ushant 10 August - British victory
Action of 13 August 1780 - British victory
Battle of Camden 16 August – Cornwallis crushes Gates, 900 patriots killed.
Battle of Fishing Creek 18 August – Tarleton defeats Sumter.
Battle of Musgrove Mill 18 August - Patriot victory
Battle of Pollilur 10 September– Tipu Sultan routs British.
Battle of Black Mingo 14 September - Patriot militias defeat British ones
Battle of Wahab's Plantation 21 September - Patriot victory
Battle of Charlotte 26 September  British capture Charlotte, North Carolina
Action of 30 September 1780 - British victory
Battle of King's Mountain 7 October – Patriots capture loyalists.
Battle of Shallow Ford 14 October - Patriot victory
Royalton raid 16 October - British defeat Vermont Republic
Battle of Klock's Field 19 October - American victory
Battle of Tearcoat Swamp 25 October - American victory
Battle of Fishdam Ford 9 November
Battle of Sangarará 18 November - Túpac Amaru II leads an uprising against Viceroyalty of Peru
Battle of Blackstock's Farm 20 November - Tarleton's first loss, allowing Patriots to send in Nathanael Greene
Battle of Fort St. George 23 November
Siege of Kastania - Ottomans get pissed off at Maniots and massacre all but 100 residents
 1781 –
Raid on Richmond 1–19 January - US Richmond severely damaged by the British
Action of 4 January 1781 - British victory over France
Battle of Jersey 6 January - British victory over France
Battle of Mobile 7 January – British unable to retake city from Spain
 Battle of Cowpens 17 January – Morgan defeats Tarleton. US victory over British loyalists.
 Battle of Cowan's Ford 1 February - British victory over the USA
 Battle of Torrence's Tavern 1–2 February - British victory over the USA
 Capture of Sint Eustatius 3 February - British forces capture Dutch Sint Eustatius
 Action of 4 February 1781 - British victory over the Netherlands
 Raid on Essequibo and Demerara 24–27 February - British raid Dutch Essequibo and Demerara
 Action of 25 February 1781 - British victory over Spain
 Battle of Wetzell's Mill 6 March - Inconclusive battle between British loyalists and the USA
 Skirmish at Waters Creek 8 March - American victory over Great Britain
 Battle of Pensacola 9 March – 8 May – Spanish and French victory over Great Britain in Florida
 Battle of Guilford Court House 15 March – Cornwallis achieves a Pyrrhic victory over Greene and Morgan. Great Britain defeats the USA.
 Battle of Cape Henry 16 March - British victory over France
 Revolt of the Comuneros 16 March-late 1781 - Large revolt in Viceroyalty of New Granada against Spain.
 Capture of HMS St. Fermin 4 April - Spain capture British ship
 Brodhead's Coshocton expedition 7–20 April - Americans loot Lenape tribes
 Battle of Porto Praya 16 April – French admiral Suffren damages English naval squadron.
 Battle of Blandford 25 April - British victory over the USA
 Battle of Hobkirk's Hill 25 April – US-commander Greene defeats British Lord Rawdon.
 Battle of Fort Royal 29–30 April – France defeats Great Britain
 Action of 1 May 1781 - British victory over Spain
 Battle of Pine's Bridge 14 May - British Loyalist victory over the USA
 Battle of Blomindon 21 May - British victory over the USA
 Siege of Augusta 22 May-6 June - US Patriots hold city against British loyalists
 Invasion of Tobago 24 May-2 June - French capture Tobago from Great Britain
 Action of 30 May 1781 - British victory over the Netherlands
 Battle of Spencer's Ordinary 26 June - Inconclusive between the USA and Great Britain
 Battle of Porto Novo 1 July - British East India Company victory over the Kingdom of Mysore
 Battle of Green Spring 6 July - British victory over the USA
 Francisco's Fight 9–24 July - American victory over Great Britain
 Action of 21 July 1781 - French victory over Great Britain
 Battle of Saldanha Bay 21 July - British victory over the Netherlands
 Battle of the House in the Horseshoe 29 July-5 August - British Loyalist victory over US Patriots
 Battle of Dogger Bank 5 August – Indecisive naval battle between Britain and the Dutch Republic
 Invasion of Minorca 19 August-5 February - Franco-Spanish victory over Great Britain
 Lochry's Defeat 24 August - British-Native victory over the USA
 Battle of Pollilur 27 August - Kingdom of Mysore victory over Great Britain
 Raid on Annapolis Royal 29 August - American privateer victory over Great Britain
 Action of 2 September 1781 - British victory over France
 Battle of the Chesapeake 5 September – French fleet, under Admiral Comte de Grasse, defeat British fleet under Admiral Thomas Graves, seals Cornwallis' fate. This French victory is a strategic victory that leads Cornwallis to surrender in Yorktown.
 Battle of Groton Heights 6 September – British seize fort from the USA, Benedict Arnold triggers a gunpowder explosion.
 Capture of HMS Savage 6 September - American victory over Great Britain
 Battle of Eutaw Springs 8 September – Greene is defeated. British loyalists defeat the USA
 Battle of Lindley's Mill 13 September - British Loyalist victory over US Patriots
Battle of Sholinghur 27 September - Great Britain defeats Mysore
Battle of Yorktown 28 September – 19 October – French and Americans begin siege of British commander Cornwallis.
Battle of Fort Slongo 3 October - The USA defeats Great Britain
Siege of Negapatam 21 October – First British major offensive military action on the Indian subcontinent. Great Britain captures Nagapattinam from the Netherlands.
Battle of Johnstown 25 October - US Patriot victory over Great Britain
Fourth Battle of Ushant 12 December – French convoy destroyed by British before escort ships can react.
Shirley's Gold Coast expedition – Start of the Fourth Anglo-Dutch War
Jahriyya revolt - Jahriyya rebels in Xinjiang break into violence with the Khufiyya, who side with the Qing dynasty and the latter two crush the former.
 1782 –
Battle of Videau's Bridge 3 January – British victory over the USA
Capture of Trincomalee 11 January - British victory over the Netherlands
Action of 15 January 1782 - British victory over Spain
Siege of Brimstone Hill 19 January-12 February - French occupy Saint Kitts and Nevis from Great Britain
Capture of Demerara and Essequibo 22 January - French capture Demerara and Essequibo from Great Britain
Battle of St. Kitts 25–26 January – British outmaneuver French but unable to save island.
Battle of Sadras 17 February – French admiral Suffren (12 ships) meets a British squadron of 9 ships under Admiral Sir Edward Hughes. French strategic victory.
Battle of Fort Elmina (1782) 18 February – British expedition against Dutch colonial outposts on the Gold Coast of Africa. Dutch victory.
Battle of Wambaw 24 February - British victory over the USA
Battle of Wuchale 14 March – Emperor Tekle Giyorgis of Ethiopia pacifies a group of Oromo near Wuchale.
Battle of Roatán 16 March - Spain defeats Great Britain
Action of 16 March 1782 - British victory over Spain
Battle of Little Mountain 22 March - Wyandots defeat US Kentuckian settlers
Battle of Delaware Bay 8 April - American victory over Great Britain
Battle of the Saintes 12 April – Admiral Sir George Rodney of Great Britain defeats the Comte de Grasse by breaking through the French line.
Battle of Providien 12 April – French and English squadrons clash in an indecisive engagement.
Battle of the Black River 13 April-23 August - British take over Spanish Nicaraguan forts 
Battle of the Monongahela 19 April - British victory over France and natives
Fifth Battle of Ushant 20–21 April - British victory over France
Second Battle of Tucson 1 May – Spanish victory over Apache warriors
First Capture of the Bahamas 6-late May - Spain takes The Bahamas from Great Britain
Crawford expedition 25 May-12 June - Natives and Brits defeat Americans
Battle off Halifax 28–29 May - British victory over the USA
Raid on Chester, Nova Scotia 30 June - British victory over the USA
Raid on Lunenburg, Nova Scotia 1 July - American victory over Great Britain
Battle of Negapatam 6 July – Indecisive engagement between British and French fleets
Action of 29 July 1782 - Inconclusive naval battle between Great Britain and France
Battle of Mokuohai July - First victory of Kamehameha I, beginning Unification of Hawaii. Kamehameha I defeated Kīwalaʻō in a struggle to control Hawaii.
Hudson Bay expedition 8 August - French victory over Great Britain
Action of 12 August 1782 - Indecisive naval battle between France and Great Britain
Battle of Blue Licks 19 August – British victory over the USA
Battle of the Combahee River 27 August - Great Britain defeats the USA
Battle of Trincomalee 3 September – British fleet under Hughes damages French fleet under Suffren but withdraws.
Action of 4 September 1782 - British victory over France
Action of 5 September 1782 - Inconclusive naval battle between France and Great Britain
Action of 10 September 1782 - Indecisive naval battle between Great Britain and France
Second Siege of Fort Henry 11–13 September - Failed British attempt to capture Ohio valley from the USA
Action of 15 September 1782 - British victory over France
Action of 18 October 1782 17–18 October - British victory over France
Battle of Cape Spartel 20 October - Indecisive naval batle between Great Britain and a coalition of Spain and France
Battle of Chillicothe 10 November – George Rogers Clark of the USA defeats Shawnees in last battle of war.
Battle of James Island 14 November - British victory over the USA
Battle of Kedges Strait 30 November - British victory over the USA
Action of 6 December 1782 - British victory over France
Action of 12 December 1782 - British victory over France and the USA
Muharram Rebellion 16 December – First anti-British rebellion to take place in the British Raj, failed independence attempt by Bengali Muslims
Battle of the Delaware Capes 20–21 December - British victory over the USA
 1783 
Action of 2 January 1783 - Inconclusive
Action of 22 January 1783 - British victory
Action of 15 February 1783 - British victory
Action of 17 February 1783 - British victory
Battle of Grand Turk 9 March
Battle of Delhi 11 March - Sikh Empire captures Delhi.
Kuban Nogai Uprising 8 April-1 October - Last uprising by the Nogais against Russia
Capture of the Bahamas 14–16 April - British recapture The Bahamas from Spain
Battle of Arkansas Post 17 April
Battle of Cuddalore 20 June – French fleet drives British fleet off shore of Cuddalore. Last of the five battles between Suffren and Hughes
Bani Utbah invasion of Bahrain 23 July - End of Persian rule in Bahrain.
Bombardment of Algiers 4–8 August - Algerian victory
Battle of Halani - Establishment of the Talpur dynasty
 1784 
 Fourth Battle of Tucson 21 March – Apache/Navaho victory over Spanish forces
 Battle of the Catalina River 21 March - Spanish victory
 Bombardment of Sousse 21 June - 4 year bombardment along the Tunisian coast
 Bombardment of Algiers 12 July - Algerian defeat
 Kettle War 8 October - Confrontation between HRE and Dutch troops
 Revolt of Horea, Cloșca and Crișan 31 October-14 December - Failed peasant rebellion in Transylvania
 Oman–Zanzibar war - Oman forcibly recaptures Zanzibar
 1785
 Battle of Rạch Gầm-Xoài Mút 19–20 January
 Battle of the Sunja 4 July
 1786 
 Battle of the Embarras River 15 April
 Shays' Rebellion 29 August - Failed rebellion caused by overtaxation
 Revolt of Radharam – British victory
 Logan's raid October - Kentucky militia attacks Shawnee
 1787 
 Battle of Jutphaas 9 May - Major battle in the Patriottentijd. Civil war in the Netherlands. Patriots defeat the Orangists.
 Bijltjesoproer 30 May - Failed rebellion of Orangists in Patriot controlled Amsterdam.
 Prussian invasion of Holland 13 September-10 October - Prussia swoops in to back the Orangists in Holland
 Battle of Jilehoy 22 September - Russians defeat Circassians
 Battle of Kinburn 12 October - Russian victory over the Ottoman Empire
 Battle of Lalsot - Jaipur and Marwar defeat the Marathas of the Gwalior State and the Mughals.
 Abaco Slave Revolt 1787 or 1788 - first slave revolt in British The Bahamas
 1788 
 Naval actions at the Siege of Ochakov 21 March-9 July - Skirmishes during the Siege of Ochakov
 Siege of Ochakov 31 May-6 December - Russian victory
 Battle of the Pinal Mountains mid June - Spain defeats Apache
 Battle of Madab June – Ras Ali, Dejazmach Hailu Eshte, and the Emperor Tekle Giyorgis I defeat the allied forces of Ras Haile Yosadiq, Dejazmach Gebre, and Wolde Gabriel; Dejazmach Wolde Gabriel is killed in battle and the pretender Baeda Maryam was captured.
 Battle of Fidonisi 14 July - Russian victory over Ottomans
 Battle of Karánsebes 21–22 September - Austrian forces, unsure who was on the other side of a bridge, fire at their own men thinking they were Ottomans. 10000 Austrians were dead when the Ottomans did show up.
 Battle of Kvistrum 29 September - Danish-Norwegian victory in a skirmish
 Battle of Chaksana - Mughals force Marathas to retreat
 1789 
Battle of Ngọc Hồi-Đống Đa 28 January-3 February - End of Lê dynasty, Qing retreats from Vietnam and recognizes Tây Sơn dynasty
Menashi–Kunashir rebellion May - Ainu in the Kuril Islands attack Wajin traders
Battle of Porrassalmi 13 June
Battle of Uttismalm 28 June
Storming of the Bastille 14 July - French rebels storm Bastille, marking one of the most famous moments of the French Revolution
Battle of Kaipiais 15 July
Battle of Parkumäki 21 July
Battle of Öland 26 July - Indecisive
Battle of Focșani 1 August
First Battle of Svensksund 24 August - Russian victory
Siege of Belgrade 15 September-8 October - Austrians take Belgrade
Battle of Rymnik 22 September
Battle of Elgsö 30 September - Swedish victory
Battle of Turnhout 27 October – Belgian rebels defeat Austrian army.
Four Days of Ghent 13–16 November - Brabant rebels kick out Holy Roman army
Battle of Nedumkotta 28 December
 1790 –
Battle of Valkeala 28 April-5 May - Swedish victory
Battle of Pardakoski–Kärnakoski 30 April - Swedish victory
Battle of Reval 13 May
Battle of Fredrikshamn 15 May
Battle of Andros 17–18 May – Lambros Katsonis defeated by Ottomans.
Battle of Keltis 19–20 May - Swedish victory
Battle of Savitaipal 3 June
Battle of Kronstadt 3–4 June - Indecisive
Battle of Uransari 16 June - Swedish victory
Battle of Patan 20 June - Maratha-Gwaliori victory
Relief of Cetingrad 22 June-20 July - Croatia is freed from Ottoman rule after 200 years.
Second Battle of Svensksund 9–10 July - Swedish victory
Battle of Björkösund 2–3 July
Battle of Vyborg Bay 4 July - Swedish manage to escape but with heavy losses
Battle of Kaipiais 15 July - Swedish defeat 
Battle of Kerch Strait 19 July - Russian victory
Saxon Peasants' Revolt July–September - Failed uprising by Saxon peasants
Battle of Tendra 8–9 September - Russian victory
Battle of Merta 10 September - Gwalior State defeats Marwar
Battle of Sittimungulum 13–15 September
Siege of Darwar 18 September - British-Maratha victory
Battle of Falmagne 22 September 
Siege of Ceuta 25 September - One year siege where Ceuta escapes Moroccan monument 
Battle of Fort Wayne 18 October – Little Turtle and Miamis defeat federal generals Joseph Harmar and Saint-Clair.
Siege of Koppal 28 October - British-Hyderabadi victory
Battle of Calicut 7–12 December
Battle of Tirurangadi7-12 December - prelude to the battle at Calicut
Capture of Cannanore 17 December - British secure Malabar Coast
Siege of Izmail 22 December - Russian victory
Battles of East Hawai'i - Unknown results
Battle of Kepaniwai – King Kamehameha I unites Hawaii.
 1791 
 Siege of Bangalore 5 February-21 March - British victory
 Battle of Arakere 15 May - Mysorean victory
 Siege of Coimbatore May - Mysorean victory
 Battle of Măcin 10 July
 Battle of Kenapacomaqua 7 August - American victory over Wea
 Battle of Cape Kaliakra 11 August
 Battle of Kawaihae Summer - One of last battles in the Unification of Hawaii
 1791 slave rebellion August - Failed slave rebellion in French Haiti
 Battle of the Wabash 4 November – Arthur St Clair defeated by Indians.
 Battle of Tellicherry 18 November
 Capture of Hooly Honore 19–21 December - British-Maratha victory
 Capture of Shimoga 29 December-3 January - British-Maratha victory
 1792 –
Siege of Seringapatam 5 February-18 March - Kingdom of Mysore cedes half its land to Britain
Battle of Croix-des-Bouquets 22 March - Insurgent black slaves and free coloured people defeat France
First Battle of Quiévrain 28 April - French victory over Austria
Capture of Porrentruy 28 April - France captures Porrentruy, capital of the Bishopric of Basel. It was defended by Austria. Porrentruy is incorporated into the French occupation zone
Battle of Marquain 29 April - Austrian victory over France
Second Battle of Quiévrain 30 April - Austrian victory. Chaotic retreat by the French.
Battle of Opsa 25–26 May - Russia defeats Poland-Lithuania
Battle of Mir 11 June - Russian victory over Poland-Lithuania
Battle of Boruszkowce 14 June - Russia defeats Poland-Lithuania
Battle of Zieleńce 18 June – Josef Poniatowski wins a battle against a Russian army group under command of General Markov.
Battle of Cap-Français 20–22 June - Indecisive naval battle between Great Britain and France
Battle of Dubienka 18 July - Poland-Lithuania withdraws after a battle with Russia
Battle of Verdun 29 August-2 September - Prussians defeat French Revolutionaries.
Siege of Thionville 24 August-16 October - French Republican troops hold the town of Thionville, repelling an attack by Austrians.
Battle of Valmy 20 September – French win against a coalition of Prussia, Austria and French royalists, and proceed to declare war on Europe.
Siege of Lille 25 September-8 October - French Republican forces hold the town of Lille, repelling an attack by Austrians.
Huilliche uprising of 1792 September - The Huilliche homeland Futahuillimapu comes under Spanish control
First Siege of Mainz 18–21 October - France captures Mainz, capital of the Electorate of Mainz. French attempt to make a democratic state in Germany.
Battle of Jemappes 6 November – French army, under General Dumouriez, defeats Austrians under General Saxe-Tenchen.
Battle of Limburg 9 November - French victory over Prussia
Battle of Anderlecht 13 November - French victory over Austria
French expedition to Sardinia 21 December - Sardinia holds independence
Capture of the Rif - The Moroccan region of Rif is held by Algeria for 3 years
 1793 –
Childers Incident 2 January - Entrance of Britain into the French Revolution. French cannons fire and damage a British warship.
First Battle of Aldenhoven 1 March - Austrian victory over France
Siege of Maastricht 2 March - Victory of a coalition of the Netherlands, French royalists, Austria and Prussia over France.
First Battle of Cholet 15 March - French royalist victory over the French republican government forces.
Battle of Neerwinden 18 March – Austrians defeat French army.
Siege of Condé 8 April-12 July - Coalition victory. Austria and French royalists capture Condé-sur-l'Escaut from France.
Siege of Port-au-Prince 12–14 April - French Republican victory over French royalists.
Second Siege of Mainz 14 April-23 July - Prussian attempt to dissolve Republic of Mainz. Prussia, Austria, Saxony, Hesse-Kassel, Hesse-Darmstadt, the Palatinate and Saxe-Weimar capture Mainz from France.
Battle of Thouars 5 May - French Royalist victory over French republican government forces.
Battle of Raismes 8–9 May - Coalition victory. Austria, Great Britain and Prussia defeat France.
Battle of Mas Deu 17–19 May - Spanish victory over France
Battle of Famars 23 May - Coalition victory. Austria, Hanover and Great Britain defeat France
Siege of Valenciennes 25 May-27 July - Coalition victory. Great Britain, Austria and Hanover capture Valenciennes from France.
First Battle of Saorgio 8–12 June - Austro-Sardinian victory over France
First Battle of Arlon 9 June - French victory over Austria
Battle of Saumur 11 June - French Royalist victory over the French Republican government forces
Action of 18 June 1793 - British victory over France
Battle of Cap-Français 20–22 June - Commissioner/Haitian victory. French Republicans defeat French Royalists.
 Battle of Nantes 29 June - French Republican government forces defeat French Royalists
 First Battle of Châtillon 5 July - French Royalist victory over French Republicans.
 Battle of Perpignan 17 July - French victory over Spain
 Battle of Vihiers 18 July - French Royalists defeat French Republicans
 Action of 31 July 1793 - Inconclusive naval batle between Great Britain and France
 Siege of Pondicherry 1–23 August - British victory. Great Britain captures Pondicherry from France
 Battle of Caesar's Camp 7–8 August - Coalition victory. Austria, Great Britain and Hanover defeat France
 Siege of Lyon 8 August-9 October - French Republicans capture Lyon from French Royalists.
 Battle of Lincelles 17 August - Coalition victory. Great Britain and the Netherlands defeat France
 Siege of Landau 20 August-23 December - French victory. Prussia fails to capture Landau from France
 Siege of Dunkirk 24 August-8 September - French victory. Great Britain, Austria, Hanover and Hesse-Kassel fail to capture Dunkirk from France.
 Siege of Le Quesnoy 28 August-13 September - Coalition victory. Austria and French Royalists capture Le Quesnoy from France.
Siege of Toulon 29 August – 19 December – Napoleon's first battle – the French Republicans defeat a combined Allied force in a crucial siege. The allies consisted out of French Royalists, French Federalists, Great Britain, Spain, Naples, Sicily and Sardinia.
Battle of Chantonnay 5 September - French Royalist victory over French Republicans
 Battle of Hondschoote (1793) 6–8 September – French army, under General Houchard, defeats British, Hanoverians and Hessians under General Walmoden.
 Battle of Avesnes-le-Sec 12 September - Austria defeats France
 Battle of Menin 12–13 September - French victory over the Netherlands and Austria
Battle of Méribel 13 September – Combined Savoy, Piedmont and Valdot forces fought the French occupying Savoy.
Battle of Pirmasens 14 September - Prussian victory over France
 Battle of Epierre 15 September - France defeats Sardinia
 First Battle of Courtrai 15 September - Coalition victory. Austria defeats France
 Battle of Peyrestortes 17 September - French victory over Spain
 Battle of Coron 18 September - French Royalist victory over French Republican government forces
 Battle of Tiffauges 19 September - French Royalist victory over French Republicans
 Battle of Pont-Barré 20 September - French Royalist victory over French Republicans
 Battle of Montaigu 21 September - Ambush by French Royalists against French Republicans
 Battle of Saint-Fulgent 22 September - French Royalist victory over French Republicans
 Battle of Truillas 22 September - Spanish victory over France
 Siege of Maubeuge 30 September-16 October - French victory over Austria and the Netherlands
 Raid on Genoa 5 October - British victory over France
 Second Battle of Châtillon 11 October - Inconclusive battle between French Royalists and French Republican government forces
 First Battle of Noirmoutier 12 October - French Royalist victory over French Republicans
 First Battle of Wissembourg 13 October - Austria, Hesse-Kassel and French Royalists defeat France
 Siege of Fort-Louis 14 October-14 November - Coalition victory. Austria, Hesse-Darmstadt and Bavaria capture Fort-Louis from France
 Battle of La Tremblaye 15 October - French Republican victory over French Royalists
Battle of Wattignies 15–16 October – French army, under Generals Jourdan and Carnot, defeats Austrians under General Saxe-Coburg.
Second Battle of Cholet 17 October - French Republican victory over French Royalists
Action of 20 October 1793 - British victory over France
Action of 22 October 1793 - Inconclusive naval battle between Great Britain and France
 Battle of Laval 22 October - French Royalists defeat French Republicans
 Action of 24 October 1793 - French victory over Great Britain
 Battle of Entrames 27 October - French Royalists defeat French Republicans
 Battle of Fougères 3 November - French Royalists defeat French Republicans
 Battle of Friedberg (Hessen) 10 November - French victory over Prussia
 Battle of Granville 14 November - French Republican government defeat French Royalists
 Battle of Biesingen 17 November - Prussia defeats France
 Battle of Haguenau 18 November-22 December - French victory over Austria, French Royalists, Hesse-Kassel and Bavaria
 Battle of Dol 20–22 November - French Royalist victory over French Republicans
First Battle of Kaiserslautern 28–30 November – Prussian army under Brunswick defeats French Army under Hoche.
Siege of Angers 3–4 December - Republican victory. French Republicans capture Angers from French Royalists.
Battle of Le Mans 12–13 December - French Republican victory over French Royalists
Battle of Gilette – French army, under General Dugommier, defeats Austrians, Piedmontese and Sardinian army.
Battle of Froeschwiller 18–22 December - French victory over Austria
Battle of Collioure 20–23 December - Spanish push out French
Battle of Woerth 22 December – French army, under General Hoche, defeats Austrians under General Hotze.
 Battle of Savenay 23 December - Final battle of the War in the Vendée. French Republican government forces defeat French Royalists.
Battle of Geisberg 26 December – French army, under General Hoche, defeats Austrians under Wurmser and Prussians under Brunswick.
Second Battle of Wissembourg 26–29 December - French victory over Austria, Prussia, Bavaria and Hesse-Kassel
 1794 –
 Sunda Strait campaign of January 1794 2 January-9 February - Inconclusive naval actions between France and a coalition of Great Britain and the Netherlands.
 Battle of Sans Culottes Camp 5 February - French victory over Spain
 Battle of Martinique 5 February-24 March - Great Britain defeats France. British hold Martinique till 1802.
 Invasion of Corsica 7 February-10 August - Anglo-Corsican victory over France
 Siege of San Fiorenzo 7–20 February - Anglo-Corsican victory over France
 Battle of the Acul 19 February - Great Britain and French Royalists defeat France
 Battle of Saint-Raphaël 20–21 March - France defeats Spain
 Battle of La Cateau (1794) 29 March - Austria defeats France
 Battle of Racławice 4 April – Polish forces under Tadeusz Kościuszko defeat larger Russian force but are unable to give chase.
 Siege of Bastia 4 April-22 May - Anglo-Corsican victory over France
 Invasion of Guadeloupe 11 April-10 December - Failed British attempt to capture Guadeloupe from France
 Second Battle of Arlon 17–18 April - French victory over Austria
Warsaw Uprising of 1794 17–19 April – Polish drive Russians out of city.
Siege of Landrecies 17 April-30 April - Coalition victory. The Netherlands and Austria capture Landrecies from France.
Vilnius Uprising 22 April – Russians expelled from city.
Action of 23 April 1794 - British victory over France
 Battle of Villers-en-Cauchies 24 April - Austria and Great Britain defeat France
 Second Battle of Saorgio 24–28 April - French victory over Austria and Sardinia
 Battle of Beaumont - Austria and Great Britain defeat France
 Battle of Mouscron 26–30 April – French army, under General Moreau and General Souham, defeats Austrians and Hanoverians under General Saxe-Coburg.
 Second Battle of Boulou 29 April-1 May - French victory over Spain and Portugal
 Battle of Gonaïves 29 April-5 May - French victory over Spain
Battle of Boulou 30 April – French army, under General Dugommier, defeats Spanish army.
Action of 5 May 1794 - British victory over France
Siege of Collioure 6–29 May - French victory over Spain
Action of 7 May 1794 - British victory over France
Battle of Willems 10 May - French victory over Austria, Great Britain, Hanover and Hesse-Darmstadt
Second Battle of Courtrai 11 May - French victory over Austria, Great Britain, Hanover and Hesse-Darmstadt
Battle of Grand-Reng 13 May - Austro-Dutch victory over France
Battle of Tourcoing 18 May – French army, under General Souham, defeats Austrians, British and Hanoverians under General Saxe-Coburg.
Second Battle of Tournay 22 May - Coalition victory. Austria, Great Britain and Hanover defeat France
Second Battle of Kaiserslautern 23 May - Prussian victory over France
Battle of Erquelinnes 24 May - Austro-Dutch victory over France
Frigate action of 29 May 1794 - British victory over France
 Battle of Port-Républicain 30 May – 5 June - Great Britain and French Royalists defeat France
 Glorious First of June 1 June - Largest battle between France and Britain during the French Revolution
 Siege of Ypres 1–18 June - French victory over Austria, Hesse-Kassel and Hanover
 Battle of Gosselies 3 June - Austro-Dutch victory over France
Battle of Szczekociny 6 June – Polish commander Tadeusz Kościuszko defeated by Russo-Prussian army.
Battle of Chełm 8 June - Russian victory over Poland
Battle of Lambusart 16 June - Austro-Dutch victory over France
Battle of Mykonos 17 June - British victory over France
Siege of Calvi 17 June-10 August - Anglo-Corsican victory over France
Battle of Fleurus (1794) 26 June – French army, under General Jourdan, defeats Austrian army under General Saxe-Coburg.
Battle of Rajgród 10 July - Kościuszko Polish rebel victory over Russia
Battle of Błonie 10 July - Kosciuszko Polish rebel victory over Prussia
Battle of Trippstadt 13–17 July - French victory over Prussia and Austria
Siege of Warsaw 13 July-6 September - Polish victory over Russia and Prussia
Battle of the Baztan Valley 23 July-1 August - French victory over Spain and French Royalists
Battle of Sant Llorenç de la Muga 13 August - French victory over Spain and Portugal
Battle of Fallen Timbers 20 August – US commander Wayne defeats Indians, ends menace.
Greater Poland uprising August–December - Prussians suppress rebellion
Battle of Boxtel 14–15 September - French victory over Great Britain, Hesse-Kassel and Hesse-Darmstadt
Battle of Sprimont 18 September - French army, under General Jourdan, defeats Austrians under General Clairfayt. France fully annexes Austrian Netherlands.
Battle of Brest 19 September - Russian victory over Poland
First Battle of Dego 21 September - French victory over Austria and Sardinia
Second Battle of Aldenhoven 2 October – French army, under General Jourdan, defeats Austrians under General Clairfayt.
Battle of Maciejowice 10 October – Koscuiszko defeated by two Russian forces, wounded, and captured.
Battle of Orbaizeta 15–17 October - French victory over Spain
Battle of Puiflijk 19 October - French victory over Great Britain and French Royalists
Action of 21 October 1794 - British victory over France
Battle of Île Ronde 22 October - Inconclusive naval battle between France and Great Britain
Siege of Nijmegen 27 October-8 November - French victory over the Netherlands, Great Britain, Hanover and Hesse-Kassel
Battle of Praga 4 November – Russian forces retake Polish Warsaw, massacring civilians and devastating the city.
Action of 6 November 1794 -  French victory over Great Britain
Battle of the Black Mountain 17–20 November - French victory over Spain and Portugal
Battle of San Lorenzo de la Muga 20 November – French army, under General Perignon, defeats Spanish army.
Siege of Luxembourg 22 November - French victory over Austria
Siege of Roses 28 November-4 February - French victory over Spain
Croisière du Grand Hiver 24 December - Failed French attempt to fight Brits
Nickajack Expedition - Chickamauga Cherokee forced to cede away territory to the USA
 1795 –
 Capture of the Dutch fleet at Den Helder 23 January - French victory over the Netherlands
 Battle of the Gulf of Roses 14 February - Spanish victory over France
 Fédon's rebellion 2 March - Failed rebellion against Great Britain in Grenada
 Action of 8 March 1795 - French victory over Great Britain
 Battle of Kharda 11 March - major defeat for Nizam of Hyderabad against the Maratha Empire
 Battle of Genoa 13–14 March - Anglo-Neapolitan victory over France
 Action of 10 April 1795 - British victory over France
 Battle of Nuʻuanu May - O'ahuan army jumps off cliff to escape Kamehameha I in a fight to control Hawaii
 Battle of Richmond Hill 7 June – Major battle of the Hawkesbury and Nepean Wars. Great Britain defeats the Dharug.
 Battle of Muizenberg 10 June-15 September – British gain control of Cape Colony over the Dutch.
 Battle of Bascara 14 June - Spanish-Portuguese victory over France
 Cornwallis's Retreat 16–17 June - Outnumbered British defeat French
 Battle of Groix 23 June - British victory over France
 Battle of Quiberon 23 June-21 July - British attempt to invade France.
 Action of 24 June 1795 - British victory over France
 Battle of the Hyères Islands 13 July - Anglo-Neapolitan victory over France
 Capture of Trincomalee 21 July – The taking by force of the port of Trincomalee in the island of Ceylon. Great Britain defeats the Batavian Republic.
 Curaçao Slave Revolt of 1795 17 August-19 September - Failed slave rebellion against the Netherlands, defining Curacaoan history
 Action of 22 August 1795 - British victory over the Batavian Republic
 Battle of Krtsanisi 8–11 September – Persians annihilate the Georgian army of the Kingdom of Kartli-Kakheti and the Kingdom of Imereti and proceed to massacre Tbilisi.
 Battle of the Diamond 21 September - Confrontation between Irish Catholics and Protestants
 Battle of Handschuhsheim 24 September - Austrian victory over France
 13 Vendémiaire 5 October - French Republicans defeat French Royalists in Paris
 Battle of the Levant Convoy 7 October - French victory over Great Britain
 Battle of Höchst 11–12 October - Austrian victory over France
 Action at Mannheim 18 October - Austrians defeat French after a truce
 Battle of Mainz 29 October - Second time balloons were used in battle. Austria defeats France.
 Battle of Pfeddersheim 10 November - Habsburg Austrian victory over the French.
 Battle of Loano 23 November – French army, under General Andre Massena, defeats Austrians, Piedmontese and Sardinian army.
 1796 –
 Battle of Voltri 10 April - Austria defeats France
 Battle of Montenotte 11-12 April – Napoleon's first victory in the Italian Campaign, French army defeat Austrians.
 Battle of Millesimo 13–14 April– French army, under Bonaparte, wins a victory in Italy against Austrians and Piedmontese.
 Battle of Dego 14-15 April – French army, under General Napoleon Bonaparte, defeats Austrians under General Beaulieu.
 Battle of Ceva 16 April - France defeats Sardinia
 Battle of Mondovì 20–22 April– French army, under Bonaparte, wins a victory in Italy against Austrians and Piedmontese.
 Battle of Fombio 17–19 April - French victory over Austria
 Persian expedition of 1796 April–November - Status quo ante bellum. Russian invasion of Persia.
Battle of Lodi 10 May – French army, under Gen. Napoleon Bonaparte, defeats Austrians under General Beaulieu.
Action of 12 May 1796 - British victory over the Batavian Republic
Siege of Derbent 21 May – Russians storm the Persian citadel of Derbent, and captures the city.
Battle of Borghetto 30 May - French victory over Austria
Action of 31 May 1796 - British victory over France
Battle of Siegburg 1 June - French victory over Austria
Battle of Altenkirchen 4 June - France defeats Austria
Atlantic raid of June 1796 4–22 June - British victory over France
Early clashes in the Rhine campaign of 1796 14 June-21 July - Comprehensive list of early battles
Battle of Wetzlar (1796) 15 June - Austria defeats France
Battle of Maudach 15 June - French victory over Austria
Battle of Kircheib 19 June - Austrian victory over France
First Battle of Kehl 23–24 June - French victory over Austria and the Swabian Circle.
Battle of Martinići (1796) 2–11 July – Convincing Montenegrin victory against much larger Turkish Army of Kara Mahmud Pasha
Battle of Rastatt (1796) 5 July - France defeats Austria
Battle of Ettlingen 9 July - French victory over Austria and Saxony
Battle of Lonato 3–4 August - French victory over Austria
Battle of Castiglione 5 August – French army, under Napoleon Bonaparte, defeats Austrians under General Wurmser.
Battle of Peschiera 6 August - France defeats Austria
Battle of Neresheim 11 August - Either French victory or inconclusive battle between France and Austria
Capitulation of Saldanha Bay 17 August - British victory over the Batavian Republic. The Dutch fail to recapture the Dutch Cape Colony.
Battle of Theiningen 21–22 August - Austrians fail to push back French, but French also don't make any gains
Battle of Amberg 24 August - Austria defeats France
Battle of Friedberg 24 August - French victory over Austria
Battle of Würzburg 3 September – Austrian Karl von Habsburg defeats French under Gen. Jourdan.
Battle of Rovereto 4 September - French victory over Austria
Newfoundland expedition 28 August-5 September - France and Spain attack Great Britain. French hold onto Newfoundland.
First Battle of Bassano 8 September – French army, under Bonaparte, defeats Austrian army.
Action of 9 September 1796 - Inconclusive naval battle between France and Great Britain
Battle of Limburg 16–19 September - Austrian victory over France
Second Battle of Kehl 18 September - Stalemate between France and Austria
Battle of Biberach (1796) 2 October - France defeats Austria
Battle of Krusi 3 October – Montenegrins defeated much larger Turkish Army of Kara Mahmud Pasha who was killed in the battle.
Action of 13 October 1796 - British victory over Spain
Battle of Emmendingen 19 October - Austrian victory over France
Battle of Schliengen 24 October - Austrian victory over France
Battle of Lopate October - Draw between Montenegro and the Ottoman Empire
Second Battle of Bassano 6 November - Austrian victory over France
Battle of Calliano 6–7 November - Austrian victory over France
First Battle of Caldiero 12 November - Austrian victory over France
Battle of the Bridge of Arcole 15–17 November – French army, under Bonaparte, defeats Austrian army.
Action of 19 December 1796 - Inconclusive naval battle between Great Britain and Spain
French expedition to Ireland December - French fleet partially destroyed by a storm, leading the expedition to fail
 1797 –
Siege of Kehl 26 October 1796 - 9 January 1797 - Austria captures French fortifications near Kehl, defending the Rhine crossings of the French army.
Action of 13 January 1797 - British victory over France
Battle of Rivoli 14 January – Napoleon's first decisive victory, French army wins a great victory against Austrians under General Alvinzy.
Action of 25 January 1797 - Spanish victory over Great Britain
Bali Strait Incident 28 January - Confrontation between French and British forces. British victory.
Siege of Hüningen 27 November 1796 - 1 February 1797 - Austria captures Huningue from France
Battle of Faenza 3 February - French victory over the Papal States
Battle of Cape St Vincent 14 February – British admiral Jervis defeats Spanish fleet.
Invasion of Trinidad 21 February - British capture and hold Trinidad from Spain
 Battle of Fishguard 22–24 February - Great Britain defeats France
Battle of Tagliamento 16 March – French army, under General Napoleon Bonaparte, defeats Austrians under Archduke Charles.
Battle of Valvasone 16 March - French victory over Austria
Battle of Parramatta 21–22 March - British capture Bidjigal leader Pemulwuy
 Battle of Tarvis (1797) 21–23 March - France defeats Austria
 Battle of Jean-Rabel 15–21 April - Great Britain defeats France
 Battle of San Juan 17 April-2 May - Spanish hold onto San Juan, Puerto Rico against Great Britain
 Battle of Neuwied (1797) 18 April – French army, under General Hoche, defeats Austrians under General Wenecek.
Battle of Diersheim (1797) 20 April – French army, under General Moreau, Desaix and Davout, defeats Austrians under Kray.
Action of 26 April 1797 - British victory over Spain
Action of 16 May 1797 - Danish forces attack Tripoli after Tripolitanian leaders demand more bribes to stop piracy.
Assault on Cádiz June–July - British fail to capture Cádiz, but both Spain and UK suffer economically.
Battle of Santa Cruz de Tenerife 22–25 July - Spanish hold onto Santa Cruz de Tenerife against Great Britain
Capture of the HMS Hermione 21–22 September - Spain captures the boat from British mutineers
Battle of Camperdown 11 October – British fleet under Admiral Duncan defeats a Dutch fleet.
 1798 –
 Raid on Manila 13 January - British hit-and-run Spanish Manila
 Raid on Zamboanga 22 January - British lose ships at Spanish Zamboanga
 French invasion of Switzerland 28 January-17 May - Switzerland becomes a French puppet state
 Battle of Grauholz 5 March - France defeats Switzerland
 Battle of the Raz de Sein 21 April - British victory over France
 Battle of the Îles Saint-Marcouf 7 May - British victory over France
 Expedition to Ostend 18 May - British recon effort against France to destroy a fleet set to invade them
 Battle of Prosperous 23 May – 19 June – Settlement changes hands twice, ultimately controlled by Government forces in an Irish rebellion against Great Britain.
 Battle of Ballymore-Eustace 24 May – Rebels unable to take stronghold from British government forces during Irish Rebellion of 1798.
Battle of Naas 24 May – Rebel attack against Great Britain barely thwarted during Irish Rebellion of 1798.
Battle of Kilcullen 24 May – British Government cavalry charge defeats rebels.
Battle of Carlow 25 May – Rebels defeated by the British government forces by two ambushes after believing they had won.
Battle of Tara Hill 26 May – British victory, spread of rebellion halted.
Battle of Oulart Hill 27 May – British Wexford militia annihilated by Rebels.
 Battle of Enniscorthy 28 May - Irish rebels defeat British government forces.
Gibbet Rath massacre 29 May – Unprovoked British attack against Irish rebels
Battle of Three Rocks 30 May – Rebel victory during Irish Rebellion of 1798 against Great Britain
Action of 30 May 1798 - British victory over France
Battle of Bunclody 1 June – British surprise counterattack after apparent Irish victory routs rebels.
Battle of Tuberneering 4 June – Rebel victory in Ireland against British government forces
Battle of New Ross 5 June – British victory, spread of rebellion into two counties halted.
Battle of Antrim 7 June – British victory against Irish rebels, Lord O'Neill mortally wounded.
Battle of Arklow 9 June – British victory, Wexford rebels forced onto the defensive.
French invasion of Malta 10–12 June - French occupy Malta
Battle of Foulksmills 20 June – British victory during Irish Rebellion of 1798
Battle of Vinegar Hill 21 June – British retake Wexford from Irish rebels
Action of 27 June 1798 - British victory over France
Action of 30 June 1798 - British victory over France
Battle of Ballyellis 30 June – British charge into a disaster, thinking they were attacking the rearguard of fleeing Irish forces.
Capture of La Croyable 7 July - First ship captured by the United States Navy from France
Battle of Shubra Khit 13 July - French defeat Mamluks
Action of 15 July 1798 - British victory over Spain
Battle of the Pyramids 21 July – Napoleon defeats Mameluks in Egypt.
Battle of the Nile 1–3 August – French fleet in Abukir Bay destroyed by British commander Horatio Nelson. Major precursor to War of the Second Coalition and Napoleon abandoning Egypt
Action of 18 August 1798 - French victory over Great Britain
Battle of Castlebar 27 August – Franco-Irish army defeats British forces.
Siege of Malta 2 September - 2-year siege of a French garrison by Maltese rebels, the British, Neapolitans and Portuguese
Battle of St. George's Caye 3–10 September - attempted Spanish invasion of British Belize.
Battle of Ballinamuck 8 September – British forces defeat Ireland and France.
 Battle of Killala 23 September – British defeat Irish rebels helped by France
 Battle of Tory Island 12 October – British defeat France
 Peasants' War 12 October-5 December - Uprising in Southern Netherlands against French rule 
 Revolt of Cairo 21–22 October - Failed protest against French rule in Egypt
 Battle of Nicopolis 23 October - Ali Pasha of Janina captures Preveza from the French 
 Action of 24 October 1798 - British victory over the Batavian Republic
 Siege of Corfu 4 November - Russo-Ottoman victory over France
 Capture of Minorca 7–15 November - Spanish Menorca occupied by British until 1802
 Capture of USS Retaliation 20 November - French victory over the USA
Battle of Civita Castelana 4 December – French and Poles under Gen. Macdonald defeat Neapolitans under Gen. Mack.
Action of 14 December 1798 - French victory over Great Britain
 1799 –
Action of 19 January 1799 - Spanish victory over Great Britain
Macau Incident 27 January - Inconclusive encounter between British, French, and Spanish warships
Action of 6 February 1799 - British victory over Spain
USS Constellation vs L'Insurgente 9 February - American morale boost during Quasi-War against France
South African Action of 9 February 1799 - British defeat French
Siege of El Arish 19 February – French capture Ottoman fort.
Action of 28 February 1799 - British victory over France
Battle of Seedaseer 6 March - Original Mysorean victory, later British victory
 Siege of Jaffa 7 March – Napoleon captures city from the Ottoman Empire
 Siege of Acre 20 March – 21 May – Unsuccessful attempt by Napoleon to capture city from the Ottoman Empire
 Battle of Ostrach 20–21 March - Austrian victory over France
 Battle of Feldkirch 23 March - Outnumbered Austrians defeat French
 First Battle of Stockach 25 March - Austrian victory over France
 Battle of Verona (1799) 26 March - Draw between France and Austria
 Battle of Mallavelly 27 March - Great Britain defeats the Kingdom of Mysore
 Italian and Swiss expedition March–December - Austria and Russia against France. Russia pulls out of the War of the Second Coalition
 Battle of Magnano 5 April - Austria defeats France
 Battle of Sultanpet Tope 5–6 April - Great Britain defeats the Kingdom of Mysore
 Battle of Mount Tabor 16 April - French victory over the Ottoman Empire
 Battle of Cassano 27 April - Austro-Russian victory over France
 Battle of Bassignana (1799) 12 May - France defeats Russia
 First Battle of Marengo 16 May - Austro-Russian victory over France
 Battle of Frauenfeld 25 May -  Stalemate between France and Austria
 Battle of Winterthur 27 May - Austria defeats France
First Battle of Zürich 4–7 June – Austrians defeat French, later driven out.
 Battle of Modena (1799) 12 June - France defeats Austria
Battle of Trebia 17–19 June – Russians and Austrians defeat French during War of the Second Coalition.
Action of 18 June 1799 - British victory over France
Second Battle of Marengo 20 June - French victory over Austria
Action of 7 July 1799 - Spanish victory over Great Britain
Battle of Abukir (1799) 25 July – Napoleon and Joachim Murat defeat Turks.
Siege of Mantua April - 30 July - Austria captures Mantua from the French controlled Cisalpine Republic
 Battle of Oberwald 13–14 August - France defeats Austria
 Battle of Schwyz 14–15 August - France defeats Austria
 Battle of Amsteg 14–16 August - French victory over Austria
Battle of Novi (1799) 15 August – Austrian and Russians beat French, Joubert is defeated and killed.
Action of 16 October 1799 - British victory over Spain
Battle of Callantsoog 27 August – Amphibious landing by a British invasion force, Dutch were forced to retreat.
Vlieter incident 30 August - Dutch surrender a ship to British
Battle of Krabbendam 10 September – Great Britain defeats France. British division had established a bridgehead in the extreme north of Holland.
 Battle of Mannheim (1799) 18 September - Austria defeats France
Battle of Bergen 19 September – French beat English and Russians.
Battle of Gotthard Pass 24–26 September - Austro-Russian victory over France
Battle of Linth (1799) 25 September – French army, under General Soult, defeats Austrians under General Hotze.
Second Battle of Zurich 25 September – French under General Massena defeat Russians under Alexander Korsakov.
Battle in the Muota Valley 30 September – 1 October - Russia and Austria defeat France
Battle of Alkmaar 2 October – Dutch-French coalition prevents a Russian-English invasion in Holland.
Battle of Castricum 6 October – Franco-Dutch force defeats an Anglo-Russian force.
Second Battle of Novi 24 October - French victory over Austria
 Battle of Genola 4 November - Austria defeats France
 Battle of Wiesloch 3 December - Austrian victory over France
 Battle of Port Louis 11 December - British victory over France
 1800 –
 Action of 1 January 1800 - Indecisive naval battle between the USA and France
 USS Constellation vs La Vengeance 1–2 February - Inconclusive, French withdraws from the USA
 Battle of the Malta Convoy 18 February - British-Maltese fleet defeats French
 Battle of Heliopolis (1800) 20 March - France defeats Great Britain and the Ottoman Empire
 Action of 31 March 1800 - British victory over France
 Battle of Malpura March - Jaipur State and British-backed Gwalior State fight over a government crisis. Victory for Gwalior.
 Action of 7 April 1800 - British victory over Spain
 Battle of Sassello 10 April - Austrian victory over France
 Battle of Engen 3 May – French army, under General Moreau, defeats Austrians under General Kray.
Battle of Stockach 3 May – French army, under General Lecourbe, defeats Austrians.
Battle of Biberach 9 May - French recapture city from Austrians
Battle of Puerto Plata Harbor 11 May - American victory in Santo Domingo against France and Spain
Battle of Möerskirch 15 May – French army, under General Moreau, defeats Austrians under General Kray.
Battle of Erbach 15 May - French victory over Austria, although heavy casualties on both sides
Combat of Turbigo 31 May - French victory over Austria
Siege of Genoa 6 April - 4 June - Austria captures Genoa from the French controlled Ligurian Republic
Battle of Montebello 9 June – French army, under General Lannes, defeats Austrians under General Ott.
Battle of Marengo 14 June – French army, under Bonaparte, defeats Austrians under Baron von Melas.
Battle of Höchstädt (1800) 19 June – French army, under General Moreau, defeats Austrians under General Kray.
 Battle of Neuburg (1800) 27 June - France defeats Austria
 Raid on Dunkirk 7 July - British victory over France
 Invasion of Curaçao 22 July-25 September - France invades Dutch Curaçao. Followed by a British invasion and occupation of Curaçao.
 Action of 4 August 1800 - British victory over France
 Ferrol Expedition 25–26 August - Failed British attempt to capture Ferrol, Spain
 USS Boston vs Berceau 12 October - US defeats French ship
 USS Enterprise vs Flambeau 25 October - American victory over France
 Battle of Ampfing (1800) 1 December - Austria defeats France
Battle of Hohenlinden 3 December – French army, under General Moreau, defeats Austrians and Bavarians under Archduke John.
Action of 10 December 1800 - Spanish victory over Great Britain
Battle of Pozzolo 25 December – French army, under General Brune, defeats Austrians under General Bellegarde.

References

External links
 Poll – The Most Important Battles in History

1601
Warfare of the Middle Ages